

515001–515100 

|-bgcolor=#d6d6d6
| 515001 ||  || — || August 15, 2009 || Kitt Peak || Spacewatch ||  || align=right | 2.4 km || 
|-id=002 bgcolor=#fefefe
| 515002 ||  || — || July 28, 2009 || Kitt Peak || Spacewatch ||  || align=right data-sort-value="0.62" | 620 m || 
|-id=003 bgcolor=#fefefe
| 515003 ||  || — || August 19, 2009 || La Sagra || OAM Obs. ||  || align=right data-sort-value="0.83" | 830 m || 
|-id=004 bgcolor=#d6d6d6
| 515004 ||  || — || August 15, 2009 || Kitt Peak || Spacewatch || Tj (2.99) || align=right | 3.6 km || 
|-id=005 bgcolor=#fefefe
| 515005 ||  || — || August 28, 2009 || La Sagra || OAM Obs. || NYS || align=right data-sort-value="0.57" | 570 m || 
|-id=006 bgcolor=#d6d6d6
| 515006 ||  || — || August 17, 2009 || Kitt Peak || Spacewatch ||  || align=right | 2.7 km || 
|-id=007 bgcolor=#d6d6d6
| 515007 ||  || — || February 25, 2007 || Mount Lemmon || Mount Lemmon Survey ||  || align=right | 2.4 km || 
|-id=008 bgcolor=#d6d6d6
| 515008 ||  || — || August 17, 2009 || Kitt Peak || Spacewatch ||  || align=right | 2.7 km || 
|-id=009 bgcolor=#fefefe
| 515009 ||  || — || September 14, 2009 || Kitt Peak || Spacewatch ||  || align=right data-sort-value="0.71" | 710 m || 
|-id=010 bgcolor=#FFC2E0
| 515010 ||  || — || September 18, 2009 || Mount Lemmon || Mount Lemmon Survey || APO || align=right data-sort-value="0.57" | 570 m || 
|-id=011 bgcolor=#d6d6d6
| 515011 ||  || — || September 16, 2009 || Kitt Peak || Spacewatch ||  || align=right | 3.0 km || 
|-id=012 bgcolor=#d6d6d6
| 515012 ||  || — || August 17, 2009 || Kitt Peak || Spacewatch || VER || align=right | 2.4 km || 
|-id=013 bgcolor=#FA8072
| 515013 ||  || — || September 17, 2009 || Kitt Peak || Spacewatch ||  || align=right data-sort-value="0.65" | 650 m || 
|-id=014 bgcolor=#fefefe
| 515014 ||  || — || September 18, 2009 || Kitt Peak || Spacewatch ||  || align=right data-sort-value="0.70" | 700 m || 
|-id=015 bgcolor=#fefefe
| 515015 ||  || — || October 31, 2006 || Kitt Peak || Spacewatch ||  || align=right data-sort-value="0.64" | 640 m || 
|-id=016 bgcolor=#d6d6d6
| 515016 ||  || — || September 18, 2009 || Kitt Peak || Spacewatch ||  || align=right | 2.4 km || 
|-id=017 bgcolor=#d6d6d6
| 515017 ||  || — || March 14, 2007 || Kitt Peak || Spacewatch ||  || align=right | 3.2 km || 
|-id=018 bgcolor=#fefefe
| 515018 ||  || — || September 18, 2009 || Kitt Peak || Spacewatch ||  || align=right data-sort-value="0.74" | 740 m || 
|-id=019 bgcolor=#d6d6d6
| 515019 ||  || — || August 17, 2009 || Kitt Peak || Spacewatch ||  || align=right | 2.9 km || 
|-id=020 bgcolor=#d6d6d6
| 515020 ||  || — || August 18, 2009 || Kitt Peak || Spacewatch ||  || align=right | 2.5 km || 
|-id=021 bgcolor=#d6d6d6
| 515021 ||  || — || August 20, 2009 || Catalina || CSS || EUP || align=right | 4.1 km || 
|-id=022 bgcolor=#d6d6d6
| 515022 ||  || — || August 19, 2009 || Kitt Peak || Spacewatch ||  || align=right | 3.5 km || 
|-id=023 bgcolor=#fefefe
| 515023 ||  || — || August 27, 2009 || Kitt Peak || Spacewatch ||  || align=right data-sort-value="0.54" | 540 m || 
|-id=024 bgcolor=#d6d6d6
| 515024 ||  || — || August 27, 2009 || Kitt Peak || Spacewatch ||  || align=right | 2.1 km || 
|-id=025 bgcolor=#fefefe
| 515025 ||  || — || September 17, 2009 || Kitt Peak || Spacewatch || NYS || align=right data-sort-value="0.52" | 520 m || 
|-id=026 bgcolor=#d6d6d6
| 515026 ||  || — || September 19, 2009 || Catalina || CSS ||  || align=right | 3.6 km || 
|-id=027 bgcolor=#fefefe
| 515027 ||  || — || September 28, 2009 || Kitt Peak || Spacewatch || MAS || align=right data-sort-value="0.46" | 460 m || 
|-id=028 bgcolor=#fefefe
| 515028 ||  || — || October 15, 2009 || La Sagra || OAM Obs. ||  || align=right | 1.6 km || 
|-id=029 bgcolor=#d6d6d6
| 515029 ||  || — || August 29, 2009 || Kitt Peak || Spacewatch ||  || align=right | 2.8 km || 
|-id=030 bgcolor=#FA8072
| 515030 ||  || — || September 28, 2009 || Catalina || CSS ||  || align=right data-sort-value="0.94" | 940 m || 
|-id=031 bgcolor=#d6d6d6
| 515031 ||  || — || November 9, 2009 || Mount Lemmon || Mount Lemmon Survey ||  || align=right | 3.6 km || 
|-id=032 bgcolor=#fefefe
| 515032 ||  || — || October 22, 2009 || Mount Lemmon || Mount Lemmon Survey ||  || align=right data-sort-value="0.64" | 640 m || 
|-id=033 bgcolor=#fefefe
| 515033 ||  || — || September 20, 2009 || Siding Spring || SSS || PHO || align=right | 1.2 km || 
|-id=034 bgcolor=#fefefe
| 515034 ||  || — || November 16, 2009 || Mount Lemmon || Mount Lemmon Survey ||  || align=right data-sort-value="0.62" | 620 m || 
|-id=035 bgcolor=#fefefe
| 515035 ||  || — || September 19, 2009 || Mount Lemmon || Mount Lemmon Survey || NYS || align=right data-sort-value="0.56" | 560 m || 
|-id=036 bgcolor=#fefefe
| 515036 ||  || — || November 17, 2009 || Kitt Peak || Spacewatch || MAS || align=right data-sort-value="0.63" | 630 m || 
|-id=037 bgcolor=#fefefe
| 515037 ||  || — || November 17, 2009 || Kitt Peak || Spacewatch ||  || align=right data-sort-value="0.92" | 920 m || 
|-id=038 bgcolor=#fefefe
| 515038 ||  || — || October 23, 2009 || Mount Lemmon || Mount Lemmon Survey ||  || align=right data-sort-value="0.65" | 650 m || 
|-id=039 bgcolor=#fefefe
| 515039 ||  || — || December 25, 2009 || Kitt Peak || Spacewatch ||  || align=right | 1.4 km || 
|-id=040 bgcolor=#fefefe
| 515040 ||  || — || December 20, 2009 || Kitt Peak || Spacewatch ||  || align=right data-sort-value="0.86" | 860 m || 
|-id=041 bgcolor=#FA8072
| 515041 ||  || — || February 11, 2010 || WISE || WISE || Tj (2.77) || align=right data-sort-value="0.87" | 870 m || 
|-id=042 bgcolor=#fefefe
| 515042 ||  || — || January 21, 2002 || Kitt Peak || Spacewatch ||  || align=right data-sort-value="0.78" | 780 m || 
|-id=043 bgcolor=#fefefe
| 515043 ||  || — || December 26, 2005 || Kitt Peak || Spacewatch || NYS || align=right data-sort-value="0.61" | 610 m || 
|-id=044 bgcolor=#fefefe
| 515044 ||  || — || February 14, 2010 || Haleakala || Pan-STARRS ||  || align=right data-sort-value="0.98" | 980 m || 
|-id=045 bgcolor=#E9E9E9
| 515045 ||  || — || February 17, 2010 || Kitt Peak || Spacewatch ||  || align=right data-sort-value="0.78" | 780 m || 
|-id=046 bgcolor=#E9E9E9
| 515046 ||  || — || March 13, 2010 || Mount Lemmon || Mount Lemmon Survey || KON || align=right | 2.0 km || 
|-id=047 bgcolor=#fefefe
| 515047 ||  || — || March 12, 2010 || Catalina || CSS || H || align=right data-sort-value="0.56" | 560 m || 
|-id=048 bgcolor=#E9E9E9
| 515048 ||  || — || March 12, 2010 || Kitt Peak || Spacewatch || HNS || align=right | 1.1 km || 
|-id=049 bgcolor=#FFC2E0
| 515049 ||  || — || March 17, 2010 || Catalina || CSS || APO || align=right data-sort-value="0.35" | 350 m || 
|-id=050 bgcolor=#E9E9E9
| 515050 ||  || — || March 25, 2010 || Kitt Peak || Spacewatch ||  || align=right data-sort-value="0.84" | 840 m || 
|-id=051 bgcolor=#E9E9E9
| 515051 ||  || — || April 1, 2010 || WISE || WISE ||  || align=right | 2.0 km || 
|-id=052 bgcolor=#E9E9E9
| 515052 ||  || — || April 20, 2006 || Kitt Peak || Spacewatch ||  || align=right data-sort-value="0.75" | 750 m || 
|-id=053 bgcolor=#E9E9E9
| 515053 ||  || — || April 5, 2010 || Kitt Peak || Spacewatch ||  || align=right | 1.4 km || 
|-id=054 bgcolor=#fefefe
| 515054 ||  || — || April 8, 2010 || Kitt Peak || Spacewatch || H || align=right data-sort-value="0.68" | 680 m || 
|-id=055 bgcolor=#E9E9E9
| 515055 ||  || — || May 4, 2010 || Catalina || CSS ||  || align=right | 1.2 km || 
|-id=056 bgcolor=#E9E9E9
| 515056 ||  || — || May 4, 2010 || Kitt Peak || Spacewatch ||  || align=right | 1.2 km || 
|-id=057 bgcolor=#E9E9E9
| 515057 ||  || — || May 13, 2010 || Kitt Peak || Spacewatch ||  || align=right | 1.6 km || 
|-id=058 bgcolor=#E9E9E9
| 515058 ||  || — || January 30, 2010 || WISE || WISE ||  || align=right | 1.5 km || 
|-id=059 bgcolor=#E9E9E9
| 515059 ||  || — || December 3, 2008 || Mount Lemmon || Mount Lemmon Survey ||  || align=right | 2.3 km || 
|-id=060 bgcolor=#d6d6d6
| 515060 ||  || — || June 9, 2010 || WISE || WISE ||  || align=right | 4.0 km || 
|-id=061 bgcolor=#d6d6d6
| 515061 ||  || — || June 10, 2010 || WISE || WISE ||  || align=right | 3.8 km || 
|-id=062 bgcolor=#d6d6d6
| 515062 ||  || — || June 10, 2010 || WISE || WISE ||  || align=right | 3.4 km || 
|-id=063 bgcolor=#E9E9E9
| 515063 ||  || — || June 24, 2010 || WISE || WISE ||  || align=right | 2.2 km || 
|-id=064 bgcolor=#E9E9E9
| 515064 ||  || — || June 24, 2010 || WISE || WISE ||  || align=right | 2.3 km || 
|-id=065 bgcolor=#d6d6d6
| 515065 ||  || — || January 8, 2007 || Mount Lemmon || Mount Lemmon Survey ||  || align=right | 3.3 km || 
|-id=066 bgcolor=#E9E9E9
| 515066 ||  || — || April 18, 2009 || Mount Lemmon || Mount Lemmon Survey ||  || align=right | 2.2 km || 
|-id=067 bgcolor=#d6d6d6
| 515067 ||  || — || July 11, 2010 || WISE || WISE ||  || align=right | 3.1 km || 
|-id=068 bgcolor=#d6d6d6
| 515068 ||  || — || July 13, 2010 || WISE || WISE ||  || align=right | 3.3 km || 
|-id=069 bgcolor=#d6d6d6
| 515069 ||  || — || July 20, 2010 || WISE || WISE ||  || align=right | 2.2 km || 
|-id=070 bgcolor=#d6d6d6
| 515070 ||  || — || November 25, 2005 || Catalina || CSS ||  || align=right | 4.3 km || 
|-id=071 bgcolor=#d6d6d6
| 515071 ||  || — || July 21, 2010 || WISE || WISE ||  || align=right | 3.5 km || 
|-id=072 bgcolor=#d6d6d6
| 515072 ||  || — || July 23, 2010 || WISE || WISE ||  || align=right | 2.6 km || 
|-id=073 bgcolor=#d6d6d6
| 515073 ||  || — || July 29, 2010 || WISE || WISE ||  || align=right | 3.0 km || 
|-id=074 bgcolor=#d6d6d6
| 515074 ||  || — || August 10, 2010 || Kitt Peak || Spacewatch || KOR || align=right | 1.4 km || 
|-id=075 bgcolor=#d6d6d6
| 515075 ||  || — || August 9, 2010 || WISE || WISE ||  || align=right | 4.4 km || 
|-id=076 bgcolor=#d6d6d6
| 515076 ||  || — || August 12, 2010 || Kitt Peak || Spacewatch || EOS || align=right | 1.3 km || 
|-id=077 bgcolor=#d6d6d6
| 515077 ||  || — || September 15, 2010 || Kitt Peak || Spacewatch ||  || align=right | 2.1 km || 
|-id=078 bgcolor=#d6d6d6
| 515078 ||  || — || September 15, 2010 || Mount Lemmon || Mount Lemmon Survey ||  || align=right | 3.1 km || 
|-id=079 bgcolor=#d6d6d6
| 515079 ||  || — || September 16, 2010 || Kitt Peak || Spacewatch ||  || align=right | 2.7 km || 
|-id=080 bgcolor=#d6d6d6
| 515080 ||  || — || November 3, 2005 || Catalina || CSS ||  || align=right | 2.9 km || 
|-id=081 bgcolor=#d6d6d6
| 515081 ||  || — || September 29, 2010 || Mount Lemmon || Mount Lemmon Survey ||  || align=right | 3.0 km || 
|-id=082 bgcolor=#FFC2E0
| 515082 ||  || — || October 25, 1981 || Palomar || S. J. Bus || AMOfast? || align=right data-sort-value="0.27" | 270 m || 
|-id=083 bgcolor=#d6d6d6
| 515083 ||  || — || April 6, 2008 || Kitt Peak || Spacewatch || EOS || align=right | 1.4 km || 
|-id=084 bgcolor=#d6d6d6
| 515084 ||  || — || September 23, 2005 || Kitt Peak || Spacewatch ||  || align=right | 2.0 km || 
|-id=085 bgcolor=#d6d6d6
| 515085 ||  || — || October 22, 2005 || Kitt Peak || Spacewatch ||  || align=right | 2.8 km || 
|-id=086 bgcolor=#d6d6d6
| 515086 ||  || — || September 16, 2010 || Kitt Peak || Spacewatch ||  || align=right | 2.0 km || 
|-id=087 bgcolor=#d6d6d6
| 515087 ||  || — || September 17, 2010 || Mount Lemmon || Mount Lemmon Survey ||  || align=right | 2.5 km || 
|-id=088 bgcolor=#d6d6d6
| 515088 ||  || — || May 1, 2008 || Kitt Peak || Spacewatch ||  || align=right | 2.9 km || 
|-id=089 bgcolor=#fefefe
| 515089 ||  || — || September 16, 2010 || Mount Lemmon || Mount Lemmon Survey ||  || align=right data-sort-value="0.65" | 650 m || 
|-id=090 bgcolor=#fefefe
| 515090 ||  || — || November 19, 2007 || Kitt Peak || Spacewatch ||  || align=right data-sort-value="0.53" | 530 m || 
|-id=091 bgcolor=#d6d6d6
| 515091 ||  || — || October 29, 2010 || Kitt Peak || Spacewatch ||  || align=right | 2.9 km || 
|-id=092 bgcolor=#fefefe
| 515092 ||  || — || October 28, 2010 || Catalina || CSS ||  || align=right data-sort-value="0.64" | 640 m || 
|-id=093 bgcolor=#d6d6d6
| 515093 ||  || — || October 30, 2010 || Mount Lemmon || Mount Lemmon Survey ||  || align=right | 3.9 km || 
|-id=094 bgcolor=#d6d6d6
| 515094 ||  || — || October 17, 2010 || Mount Lemmon || Mount Lemmon Survey ||  || align=right | 2.5 km || 
|-id=095 bgcolor=#d6d6d6
| 515095 ||  || — || October 14, 2010 || Mount Lemmon || Mount Lemmon Survey ||  || align=right | 2.2 km || 
|-id=096 bgcolor=#d6d6d6
| 515096 ||  || — || November 5, 2010 || Mount Lemmon || Mount Lemmon Survey || EOS || align=right | 1.9 km || 
|-id=097 bgcolor=#d6d6d6
| 515097 ||  || — || October 14, 2010 || Mount Lemmon || Mount Lemmon Survey ||  || align=right | 2.9 km || 
|-id=098 bgcolor=#d6d6d6
| 515098 ||  || — || September 16, 2010 || Mount Lemmon || Mount Lemmon Survey ||  || align=right | 2.4 km || 
|-id=099 bgcolor=#d6d6d6
| 515099 ||  || — || October 27, 2005 || Kitt Peak || Spacewatch ||  || align=right | 2.3 km || 
|-id=100 bgcolor=#d6d6d6
| 515100 ||  || — || October 30, 2010 || Mount Lemmon || Mount Lemmon Survey ||  || align=right | 2.4 km || 
|}

515101–515200 

|-bgcolor=#d6d6d6
| 515101 ||  || — || September 5, 2010 || Mount Lemmon || Mount Lemmon Survey || EOS || align=right | 1.6 km || 
|-id=102 bgcolor=#d6d6d6
| 515102 ||  || — || November 1, 2010 || Kitt Peak || Spacewatch ||  || align=right | 3.6 km || 
|-id=103 bgcolor=#d6d6d6
| 515103 ||  || — || October 14, 2010 || Mount Lemmon || Mount Lemmon Survey || VER || align=right | 2.7 km || 
|-id=104 bgcolor=#d6d6d6
| 515104 ||  || — || October 17, 2010 || Mount Lemmon || Mount Lemmon Survey || EOS || align=right | 1.6 km || 
|-id=105 bgcolor=#d6d6d6
| 515105 ||  || — || September 16, 2010 || Mount Lemmon || Mount Lemmon Survey ||  || align=right | 2.5 km || 
|-id=106 bgcolor=#d6d6d6
| 515106 ||  || — || October 28, 2010 || Mount Lemmon || Mount Lemmon Survey ||  || align=right | 2.5 km || 
|-id=107 bgcolor=#d6d6d6
| 515107 ||  || — || April 14, 2007 || Mount Lemmon || Mount Lemmon Survey ||  || align=right | 2.5 km || 
|-id=108 bgcolor=#d6d6d6
| 515108 ||  || — || November 27, 2010 || Mount Lemmon || Mount Lemmon Survey ||  || align=right | 3.1 km || 
|-id=109 bgcolor=#d6d6d6
| 515109 ||  || — || November 27, 2010 || Mount Lemmon || Mount Lemmon Survey || THM || align=right | 2.2 km || 
|-id=110 bgcolor=#d6d6d6
| 515110 ||  || — || October 17, 2010 || Catalina || CSS ||  || align=right | 2.8 km || 
|-id=111 bgcolor=#fefefe
| 515111 ||  || — || January 12, 2008 || Kitt Peak || Spacewatch ||  || align=right data-sort-value="0.54" | 540 m || 
|-id=112 bgcolor=#fefefe
| 515112 ||  || — || January 9, 2011 || Kitt Peak || Spacewatch ||  || align=right data-sort-value="0.56" | 560 m || 
|-id=113 bgcolor=#fefefe
| 515113 ||  || — || April 6, 2008 || Kitt Peak || Spacewatch ||  || align=right data-sort-value="0.47" | 470 m || 
|-id=114 bgcolor=#fefefe
| 515114 ||  || — || February 10, 2008 || Kitt Peak || Spacewatch ||  || align=right data-sort-value="0.49" | 490 m || 
|-id=115 bgcolor=#fefefe
| 515115 ||  || — || September 30, 2006 || Mount Lemmon || Mount Lemmon Survey ||  || align=right data-sort-value="0.50" | 500 m || 
|-id=116 bgcolor=#fefefe
| 515116 ||  || — || February 4, 2011 || Haleakala || Pan-STARRS ||  || align=right data-sort-value="0.62" | 620 m || 
|-id=117 bgcolor=#fefefe
| 515117 ||  || — || February 25, 2011 || Mount Lemmon || Mount Lemmon Survey ||  || align=right data-sort-value="0.70" | 700 m || 
|-id=118 bgcolor=#fefefe
| 515118 ||  || — || February 17, 2004 || Kitt Peak || Spacewatch ||  || align=right data-sort-value="0.75" | 750 m || 
|-id=119 bgcolor=#fefefe
| 515119 ||  || — || February 26, 2011 || Kitt Peak || Spacewatch ||  || align=right data-sort-value="0.79" | 790 m || 
|-id=120 bgcolor=#fefefe
| 515120 ||  || — || May 7, 2008 || Mount Lemmon || Mount Lemmon Survey ||  || align=right data-sort-value="0.70" | 700 m || 
|-id=121 bgcolor=#fefefe
| 515121 ||  || — || March 17, 2004 || Kitt Peak || Spacewatch ||  || align=right data-sort-value="0.67" | 670 m || 
|-id=122 bgcolor=#fefefe
| 515122 ||  || — || November 16, 2006 || Kitt Peak || Spacewatch ||  || align=right data-sort-value="0.55" | 550 m || 
|-id=123 bgcolor=#fefefe
| 515123 ||  || — || September 16, 2009 || Mount Lemmon || Mount Lemmon Survey ||  || align=right data-sort-value="0.60" | 600 m || 
|-id=124 bgcolor=#fefefe
| 515124 ||  || — || September 21, 2009 || Mount Lemmon || Mount Lemmon Survey ||  || align=right data-sort-value="0.62" | 620 m || 
|-id=125 bgcolor=#fefefe
| 515125 ||  || — || August 18, 2009 || Siding Spring || SSS ||  || align=right data-sort-value="0.99" | 990 m || 
|-id=126 bgcolor=#fefefe
| 515126 ||  || — || August 4, 2008 || La Sagra || OAM Obs. ||  || align=right data-sort-value="0.75" | 750 m || 
|-id=127 bgcolor=#fefefe
| 515127 ||  || — || March 27, 2011 || Kitt Peak || Spacewatch ||  || align=right data-sort-value="0.53" | 530 m || 
|-id=128 bgcolor=#fefefe
| 515128 ||  || — || February 25, 2011 || Mount Lemmon || Mount Lemmon Survey ||  || align=right data-sort-value="0.75" | 750 m || 
|-id=129 bgcolor=#fefefe
| 515129 ||  || — || July 3, 2005 || Mount Lemmon || Mount Lemmon Survey ||  || align=right | 1.00 km || 
|-id=130 bgcolor=#fefefe
| 515130 ||  || — || March 14, 2011 || Kitt Peak || Spacewatch ||  || align=right data-sort-value="0.59" | 590 m || 
|-id=131 bgcolor=#fefefe
| 515131 ||  || — || September 19, 2001 || Socorro || LINEAR ||  || align=right data-sort-value="0.79" | 790 m || 
|-id=132 bgcolor=#fefefe
| 515132 ||  || — || February 22, 2011 || Kitt Peak || Spacewatch ||  || align=right data-sort-value="0.73" | 730 m || 
|-id=133 bgcolor=#fefefe
| 515133 ||  || — || March 10, 2011 || Kitt Peak || Spacewatch || NYS || align=right data-sort-value="0.55" | 550 m || 
|-id=134 bgcolor=#fefefe
| 515134 ||  || — || September 6, 2008 || Mount Lemmon || Mount Lemmon Survey || NYS || align=right data-sort-value="0.47" | 470 m || 
|-id=135 bgcolor=#fefefe
| 515135 ||  || — || April 13, 2004 || Kitt Peak || Spacewatch ||  || align=right data-sort-value="0.50" | 500 m || 
|-id=136 bgcolor=#FA8072
| 515136 ||  || — || March 9, 2011 || Haleakala || Pan-STARRS ||  || align=right data-sort-value="0.82" | 820 m || 
|-id=137 bgcolor=#fefefe
| 515137 ||  || — || March 28, 2011 || Kitt Peak || Spacewatch ||  || align=right data-sort-value="0.85" | 850 m || 
|-id=138 bgcolor=#fefefe
| 515138 ||  || — || February 15, 2010 || WISE || WISE || PHO || align=right data-sort-value="0.90" | 900 m || 
|-id=139 bgcolor=#fefefe
| 515139 ||  || — || March 31, 2011 || Kitt Peak || Spacewatch ||  || align=right data-sort-value="0.72" | 720 m || 
|-id=140 bgcolor=#fefefe
| 515140 ||  || — || April 6, 2011 || Mount Lemmon || Mount Lemmon Survey ||  || align=right data-sort-value="0.70" | 700 m || 
|-id=141 bgcolor=#fefefe
| 515141 ||  || — || April 27, 2011 || Kitt Peak || Spacewatch ||  || align=right data-sort-value="0.86" | 860 m || 
|-id=142 bgcolor=#fefefe
| 515142 ||  || — || March 25, 2011 || Kitt Peak || Spacewatch ||  || align=right data-sort-value="0.73" | 730 m || 
|-id=143 bgcolor=#fefefe
| 515143 ||  || — || March 27, 2004 || Kitt Peak || Spacewatch ||  || align=right data-sort-value="0.65" | 650 m || 
|-id=144 bgcolor=#fefefe
| 515144 ||  || — || April 26, 2011 || Kitt Peak || Spacewatch ||  || align=right data-sort-value="0.68" | 680 m || 
|-id=145 bgcolor=#fefefe
| 515145 ||  || — || April 13, 2011 || Mount Lemmon || Mount Lemmon Survey ||  || align=right data-sort-value="0.75" | 750 m || 
|-id=146 bgcolor=#fefefe
| 515146 ||  || — || April 30, 2011 || Kitt Peak || Spacewatch ||  || align=right data-sort-value="0.62" | 620 m || 
|-id=147 bgcolor=#fefefe
| 515147 ||  || — || May 8, 2011 || Socorro || LINEAR ||  || align=right | 2.8 km || 
|-id=148 bgcolor=#fefefe
| 515148 ||  || — || April 13, 2011 || Mount Lemmon || Mount Lemmon Survey ||  || align=right data-sort-value="0.64" | 640 m || 
|-id=149 bgcolor=#fefefe
| 515149 ||  || — || January 30, 2011 || Haleakala || Pan-STARRS || V || align=right data-sort-value="0.84" | 840 m || 
|-id=150 bgcolor=#fefefe
| 515150 ||  || — || March 13, 2007 || Mount Lemmon || Mount Lemmon Survey || NYS || align=right data-sort-value="0.52" | 520 m || 
|-id=151 bgcolor=#fefefe
| 515151 ||  || — || May 22, 2011 || Mount Lemmon || Mount Lemmon Survey ||  || align=right data-sort-value="0.79" | 790 m || 
|-id=152 bgcolor=#fefefe
| 515152 ||  || — || May 26, 2011 || Kitt Peak || Spacewatch ||  || align=right data-sort-value="0.79" | 790 m || 
|-id=153 bgcolor=#E9E9E9
| 515153 ||  || — || June 12, 2011 || Haleakala || Pan-STARRS ||  || align=right | 1.7 km || 
|-id=154 bgcolor=#E9E9E9
| 515154 ||  || — || June 26, 2011 || Mount Lemmon || Mount Lemmon Survey ||  || align=right data-sort-value="0.93" | 930 m || 
|-id=155 bgcolor=#C2FFFF
| 515155 ||  || — || June 27, 2011 || Kitt Peak || Spacewatch || L5 || align=right | 8.6 km || 
|-id=156 bgcolor=#fefefe
| 515156 ||  || — || July 26, 2011 || Haleakala || Pan-STARRS || MAS || align=right data-sort-value="0.75" | 750 m || 
|-id=157 bgcolor=#E9E9E9
| 515157 ||  || — || July 24, 2011 || Haleakala || Pan-STARRS ||  || align=right data-sort-value="0.92" | 920 m || 
|-id=158 bgcolor=#fefefe
| 515158 ||  || — || July 27, 2011 || Haleakala || Pan-STARRS ||  || align=right data-sort-value="0.96" | 960 m || 
|-id=159 bgcolor=#E9E9E9
| 515159 ||  || — || August 10, 2011 || Haleakala || Pan-STARRS ||  || align=right | 1.7 km || 
|-id=160 bgcolor=#d6d6d6
| 515160 ||  || — || August 10, 2011 || Haleakala || Pan-STARRS ||  || align=right | 2.9 km || 
|-id=161 bgcolor=#fefefe
| 515161 ||  || — || August 23, 2011 || Socorro || LINEAR || H || align=right data-sort-value="0.57" | 570 m || 
|-id=162 bgcolor=#fefefe
| 515162 ||  || — || August 22, 2011 || La Sagra || OAM Obs. || H || align=right data-sort-value="0.61" | 610 m || 
|-id=163 bgcolor=#E9E9E9
| 515163 ||  || — || September 5, 2002 || Anderson Mesa || LONEOS ||  || align=right | 2.7 km || 
|-id=164 bgcolor=#E9E9E9
| 515164 ||  || — || September 21, 2007 || XuYi || PMO NEO ||  || align=right | 1.8 km || 
|-id=165 bgcolor=#fefefe
| 515165 ||  || — || July 27, 2011 || Haleakala || Pan-STARRS ||  || align=right data-sort-value="0.92" | 920 m || 
|-id=166 bgcolor=#fefefe
| 515166 ||  || — || August 29, 2011 || Haleakala || Pan-STARRS || H || align=right data-sort-value="0.47" | 470 m || 
|-id=167 bgcolor=#fefefe
| 515167 ||  || — || August 25, 2011 || La Sagra || OAM Obs. ||  || align=right data-sort-value="0.82" | 820 m || 
|-id=168 bgcolor=#E9E9E9
| 515168 ||  || — || August 30, 2011 || Haleakala || Pan-STARRS ||  || align=right | 2.0 km || 
|-id=169 bgcolor=#E9E9E9
| 515169 ||  || — || October 11, 2007 || Kitt Peak || Spacewatch ||  || align=right data-sort-value="0.81" | 810 m || 
|-id=170 bgcolor=#E9E9E9
| 515170 ||  || — || September 18, 2011 || Mount Lemmon || Mount Lemmon Survey ||  || align=right | 1.7 km || 
|-id=171 bgcolor=#E9E9E9
| 515171 ||  || — || September 23, 2011 || Haleakala || Pan-STARRS ||  || align=right | 1.7 km || 
|-id=172 bgcolor=#E9E9E9
| 515172 ||  || — || December 6, 2007 || Kitt Peak || Spacewatch ||  || align=right | 2.2 km || 
|-id=173 bgcolor=#E9E9E9
| 515173 ||  || — || July 9, 2011 || Haleakala || Pan-STARRS ||  || align=right | 2.0 km || 
|-id=174 bgcolor=#E9E9E9
| 515174 ||  || — || September 24, 2011 || Mount Lemmon || Mount Lemmon Survey ||  || align=right | 1.3 km || 
|-id=175 bgcolor=#E9E9E9
| 515175 ||  || — || September 4, 2011 || Haleakala || Pan-STARRS ||  || align=right | 2.2 km || 
|-id=176 bgcolor=#E9E9E9
| 515176 ||  || — || September 23, 2011 || Haleakala || Pan-STARRS || EUN || align=right | 1.4 km || 
|-id=177 bgcolor=#d6d6d6
| 515177 ||  || — || September 22, 2011 || Kitt Peak || Spacewatch ||  || align=right | 2.0 km || 
|-id=178 bgcolor=#E9E9E9
| 515178 ||  || — || September 8, 2011 || Kitt Peak || Spacewatch ||  || align=right | 1.7 km || 
|-id=179 bgcolor=#E9E9E9
| 515179 ||  || — || September 24, 2011 || Haleakala || Pan-STARRS ||  || align=right | 1.9 km || 
|-id=180 bgcolor=#E9E9E9
| 515180 ||  || — || September 22, 2011 || Kitt Peak || Spacewatch ||  || align=right | 1.5 km || 
|-id=181 bgcolor=#E9E9E9
| 515181 ||  || — || August 28, 2011 || Siding Spring || SSS ||  || align=right | 2.6 km || 
|-id=182 bgcolor=#E9E9E9
| 515182 ||  || — || June 9, 2011 || Mount Lemmon || Mount Lemmon Survey ||  || align=right | 1.9 km || 
|-id=183 bgcolor=#E9E9E9
| 515183 ||  || — || October 20, 2011 || Mount Lemmon || Mount Lemmon Survey || GEF || align=right | 1.2 km || 
|-id=184 bgcolor=#E9E9E9
| 515184 ||  || — || September 29, 2011 || Mount Lemmon || Mount Lemmon Survey ||  || align=right | 2.1 km || 
|-id=185 bgcolor=#E9E9E9
| 515185 ||  || — || October 19, 2011 || Kitt Peak || Spacewatch || WIT || align=right data-sort-value="0.89" | 890 m || 
|-id=186 bgcolor=#E9E9E9
| 515186 ||  || — || October 18, 2011 || Mount Lemmon || Mount Lemmon Survey ||  || align=right | 1.3 km || 
|-id=187 bgcolor=#E9E9E9
| 515187 ||  || — || October 19, 2011 || Mount Lemmon || Mount Lemmon Survey || ADE || align=right | 2.1 km || 
|-id=188 bgcolor=#E9E9E9
| 515188 ||  || — || October 20, 2011 || Mount Lemmon || Mount Lemmon Survey ||  || align=right | 1.8 km || 
|-id=189 bgcolor=#d6d6d6
| 515189 ||  || — || October 18, 2011 || Kitt Peak || Spacewatch ||  || align=right | 1.9 km || 
|-id=190 bgcolor=#FA8072
| 515190 ||  || — || March 12, 2010 || Kitt Peak || Spacewatch || H || align=right data-sort-value="0.59" | 590 m || 
|-id=191 bgcolor=#E9E9E9
| 515191 ||  || — || October 25, 2011 || Kitt Peak || Spacewatch ||  || align=right | 2.0 km || 
|-id=192 bgcolor=#E9E9E9
| 515192 ||  || — || October 24, 2011 || Mount Lemmon || Mount Lemmon Survey ||  || align=right | 1.9 km || 
|-id=193 bgcolor=#E9E9E9
| 515193 ||  || — || September 23, 2011 || Haleakala || Pan-STARRS ||  || align=right | 1.8 km || 
|-id=194 bgcolor=#fefefe
| 515194 ||  || — || September 27, 2011 || Mount Lemmon || Mount Lemmon Survey || H || align=right data-sort-value="0.61" | 610 m || 
|-id=195 bgcolor=#d6d6d6
| 515195 ||  || — || October 26, 2011 || Haleakala || Pan-STARRS ||  || align=right | 1.9 km || 
|-id=196 bgcolor=#E9E9E9
| 515196 ||  || — || October 30, 2011 || Mount Lemmon || Mount Lemmon Survey || GEF || align=right | 1.3 km || 
|-id=197 bgcolor=#E9E9E9
| 515197 ||  || — || May 8, 2005 || Kitt Peak || Spacewatch || WIT || align=right | 1.1 km || 
|-id=198 bgcolor=#E9E9E9
| 515198 ||  || — || September 28, 2011 || Kitt Peak || Spacewatch ||  || align=right | 2.0 km || 
|-id=199 bgcolor=#E9E9E9
| 515199 ||  || — || August 4, 2011 || Haleakala || Pan-STARRS ||  || align=right | 1.1 km || 
|-id=200 bgcolor=#E9E9E9
| 515200 ||  || — || October 24, 2011 || Kitt Peak || Spacewatch ||  || align=right | 2.0 km || 
|}

515201–515300 

|-bgcolor=#E9E9E9
| 515201 ||  || — || November 13, 2007 || Mount Lemmon || Mount Lemmon Survey ||  || align=right | 1.8 km || 
|-id=202 bgcolor=#d6d6d6
| 515202 ||  || — || October 25, 2011 || Haleakala || Pan-STARRS ||  || align=right | 2.5 km || 
|-id=203 bgcolor=#fefefe
| 515203 ||  || — || October 19, 2011 || Kitt Peak || Spacewatch || H || align=right data-sort-value="0.71" | 710 m || 
|-id=204 bgcolor=#d6d6d6
| 515204 ||  || — || November 3, 2011 || Kitt Peak || Spacewatch ||  || align=right | 1.8 km || 
|-id=205 bgcolor=#E9E9E9
| 515205 ||  || — || January 13, 2008 || Kitt Peak || Spacewatch ||  || align=right | 1.7 km || 
|-id=206 bgcolor=#E9E9E9
| 515206 ||  || — || October 26, 2011 || Haleakala || Pan-STARRS ||  || align=right | 2.0 km || 
|-id=207 bgcolor=#d6d6d6
| 515207 ||  || — || November 24, 2011 || Mount Lemmon || Mount Lemmon Survey ||  || align=right | 2.2 km || 
|-id=208 bgcolor=#d6d6d6
| 515208 ||  || — || January 17, 2007 || Kitt Peak || Spacewatch ||  || align=right | 1.6 km || 
|-id=209 bgcolor=#d6d6d6
| 515209 ||  || — || November 16, 2011 || Kitt Peak || Spacewatch ||  || align=right | 2.5 km || 
|-id=210 bgcolor=#E9E9E9
| 515210 ||  || — || October 25, 2011 || Haleakala || Pan-STARRS ||  || align=right | 2.2 km || 
|-id=211 bgcolor=#d6d6d6
| 515211 ||  || — || December 21, 2006 || Kitt Peak || Spacewatch ||  || align=right | 1.6 km || 
|-id=212 bgcolor=#d6d6d6
| 515212 ||  || — || October 30, 2010 || Mount Lemmon || Mount Lemmon Survey ||  || align=right | 2.4 km || 
|-id=213 bgcolor=#d6d6d6
| 515213 ||  || — || November 28, 2011 || Mount Lemmon || Mount Lemmon Survey ||  || align=right | 2.7 km || 
|-id=214 bgcolor=#d6d6d6
| 515214 ||  || — || November 18, 2011 || Mount Lemmon || Mount Lemmon Survey ||  || align=right | 2.3 km || 
|-id=215 bgcolor=#d6d6d6
| 515215 ||  || — || June 21, 2010 || WISE || WISE ||  || align=right | 2.8 km || 
|-id=216 bgcolor=#d6d6d6
| 515216 ||  || — || October 11, 2010 || Mount Lemmon || Mount Lemmon Survey ||  || align=right | 2.7 km || 
|-id=217 bgcolor=#d6d6d6
| 515217 ||  || — || December 3, 2010 || Mount Lemmon || Mount Lemmon Survey ||  || align=right | 3.2 km || 
|-id=218 bgcolor=#d6d6d6
| 515218 ||  || — || August 25, 2009 || La Sagra || OAM Obs. || EOS || align=right | 2.4 km || 
|-id=219 bgcolor=#d6d6d6
| 515219 ||  || — || September 24, 2005 || Kitt Peak || Spacewatch ||  || align=right | 2.3 km || 
|-id=220 bgcolor=#d6d6d6
| 515220 ||  || — || January 19, 2012 || Mount Lemmon || Mount Lemmon Survey ||  || align=right | 2.5 km || 
|-id=221 bgcolor=#d6d6d6
| 515221 ||  || — || November 3, 2005 || Mount Lemmon || Mount Lemmon Survey ||  || align=right | 2.4 km || 
|-id=222 bgcolor=#d6d6d6
| 515222 ||  || — || August 6, 2010 || WISE || WISE ||  || align=right | 4.2 km || 
|-id=223 bgcolor=#d6d6d6
| 515223 ||  || — || December 27, 2011 || Kitt Peak || Spacewatch || EOS || align=right | 1.7 km || 
|-id=224 bgcolor=#d6d6d6
| 515224 ||  || — || November 16, 2010 || Mount Lemmon || Mount Lemmon Survey || EOS || align=right | 2.0 km || 
|-id=225 bgcolor=#d6d6d6
| 515225 ||  || — || December 27, 2011 || Catalina || CSS || 7:4* || align=right | 2.9 km || 
|-id=226 bgcolor=#d6d6d6
| 515226 ||  || — || October 25, 2005 || Kitt Peak || Spacewatch ||  || align=right | 2.1 km || 
|-id=227 bgcolor=#d6d6d6
| 515227 ||  || — || February 17, 2007 || Kitt Peak || Spacewatch ||  || align=right | 1.9 km || 
|-id=228 bgcolor=#d6d6d6
| 515228 ||  || — || January 25, 2006 || Catalina || CSS ||  || align=right | 3.3 km || 
|-id=229 bgcolor=#fefefe
| 515229 ||  || — || December 27, 2011 || Kitt Peak || Spacewatch || H || align=right data-sort-value="0.75" | 750 m || 
|-id=230 bgcolor=#d6d6d6
| 515230 ||  || — || January 26, 2012 || Haleakala || Pan-STARRS ||  || align=right | 2.8 km || 
|-id=231 bgcolor=#d6d6d6
| 515231 ||  || — || January 19, 2012 || Kitt Peak || Spacewatch || THM || align=right | 1.7 km || 
|-id=232 bgcolor=#d6d6d6
| 515232 ||  || — || December 28, 2005 || Kitt Peak || Spacewatch ||  || align=right | 2.6 km || 
|-id=233 bgcolor=#d6d6d6
| 515233 ||  || — || January 14, 2012 || Kitt Peak || Spacewatch || THB || align=right | 2.4 km || 
|-id=234 bgcolor=#d6d6d6
| 515234 ||  || — || January 27, 2012 || Mount Lemmon || Mount Lemmon Survey ||  || align=right | 2.8 km || 
|-id=235 bgcolor=#d6d6d6
| 515235 ||  || — || January 19, 2012 || Haleakala || Pan-STARRS || VER || align=right | 2.3 km || 
|-id=236 bgcolor=#d6d6d6
| 515236 ||  || — || January 26, 2012 || Mount Lemmon || Mount Lemmon Survey || THM || align=right | 1.9 km || 
|-id=237 bgcolor=#fefefe
| 515237 ||  || — || January 23, 2012 || Catalina || CSS || H || align=right | 1.0 km || 
|-id=238 bgcolor=#d6d6d6
| 515238 ||  || — || March 14, 2007 || Mount Lemmon || Mount Lemmon Survey ||  || align=right | 2.5 km || 
|-id=239 bgcolor=#d6d6d6
| 515239 ||  || — || April 23, 2007 || Kitt Peak || Spacewatch ||  || align=right | 3.0 km || 
|-id=240 bgcolor=#d6d6d6
| 515240 ||  || — || December 28, 2005 || Kitt Peak || Spacewatch ||  || align=right | 3.2 km || 
|-id=241 bgcolor=#d6d6d6
| 515241 ||  || — || January 4, 2006 || Kitt Peak || Spacewatch ||  || align=right | 2.3 km || 
|-id=242 bgcolor=#d6d6d6
| 515242 ||  || — || December 8, 2005 || Kitt Peak || Spacewatch ||  || align=right | 2.2 km || 
|-id=243 bgcolor=#d6d6d6
| 515243 ||  || — || January 27, 2012 || Kitt Peak || Spacewatch ||  || align=right | 2.6 km || 
|-id=244 bgcolor=#d6d6d6
| 515244 ||  || — || January 29, 2012 || Kitt Peak || Spacewatch ||  || align=right | 2.8 km || 
|-id=245 bgcolor=#d6d6d6
| 515245 ||  || — || January 18, 2012 || Kitt Peak || Spacewatch ||  || align=right | 2.5 km || 
|-id=246 bgcolor=#d6d6d6
| 515246 ||  || — || February 13, 2012 || Haleakala || Pan-STARRS ||  || align=right | 3.1 km || 
|-id=247 bgcolor=#d6d6d6
| 515247 ||  || — || January 20, 2012 || Kitt Peak || Spacewatch || TIR || align=right | 2.7 km || 
|-id=248 bgcolor=#d6d6d6
| 515248 ||  || — || January 19, 2012 || Haleakala || Pan-STARRS ||  || align=right | 3.1 km || 
|-id=249 bgcolor=#d6d6d6
| 515249 ||  || — || January 19, 2012 || Haleakala || Pan-STARRS || (7605) || align=right | 2.9 km || 
|-id=250 bgcolor=#d6d6d6
| 515250 ||  || — || February 3, 2012 || Haleakala || Pan-STARRS ||  || align=right | 2.9 km || 
|-id=251 bgcolor=#d6d6d6
| 515251 ||  || — || January 4, 2012 || Mount Lemmon || Mount Lemmon Survey ||  || align=right | 2.7 km || 
|-id=252 bgcolor=#d6d6d6
| 515252 ||  || — || February 1, 2006 || Mount Lemmon || Mount Lemmon Survey ||  || align=right | 3.0 km || 
|-id=253 bgcolor=#d6d6d6
| 515253 ||  || — || January 19, 2012 || Haleakala || Pan-STARRS ||  || align=right | 2.7 km || 
|-id=254 bgcolor=#d6d6d6
| 515254 ||  || — || January 26, 2012 || Mount Lemmon || Mount Lemmon Survey || Tj (2.99) || align=right | 3.4 km || 
|-id=255 bgcolor=#d6d6d6
| 515255 ||  || — || February 21, 2012 || Kitt Peak || Spacewatch ||  || align=right | 2.8 km || 
|-id=256 bgcolor=#d6d6d6
| 515256 ||  || — || March 15, 2012 || Mount Lemmon || Mount Lemmon Survey ||  || align=right | 3.0 km || 
|-id=257 bgcolor=#fefefe
| 515257 ||  || — || May 1, 2012 || Mount Lemmon || Mount Lemmon Survey ||  || align=right data-sort-value="0.58" | 580 m || 
|-id=258 bgcolor=#fefefe
| 515258 ||  || — || October 26, 2005 || Kitt Peak || Spacewatch ||  || align=right data-sort-value="0.60" | 600 m || 
|-id=259 bgcolor=#d6d6d6
| 515259 ||  || — || April 12, 2010 || Mount Lemmon || Mount Lemmon Survey || 3:2 || align=right | 4.0 km || 
|-id=260 bgcolor=#d6d6d6
| 515260 ||  || — || January 8, 2010 || WISE || WISE || 3:2 || align=right | 5.9 km || 
|-id=261 bgcolor=#fefefe
| 515261 ||  || — || July 18, 2012 || Catalina || CSS ||  || align=right | 1.2 km || 
|-id=262 bgcolor=#fefefe
| 515262 ||  || — || August 11, 2012 || Siding Spring || SSS ||  || align=right data-sort-value="0.84" | 840 m || 
|-id=263 bgcolor=#E9E9E9
| 515263 ||  || — || October 9, 1999 || Socorro || LINEAR ||  || align=right | 1.2 km || 
|-id=264 bgcolor=#fefefe
| 515264 ||  || — || August 25, 2012 || Haleakala || Pan-STARRS ||  || align=right data-sort-value="0.85" | 850 m || 
|-id=265 bgcolor=#fefefe
| 515265 ||  || — || August 26, 2012 || Catalina || CSS ||  || align=right | 1.9 km || 
|-id=266 bgcolor=#fefefe
| 515266 ||  || — || September 17, 2012 || Kitt Peak || Spacewatch ||  || align=right data-sort-value="0.82" | 820 m || 
|-id=267 bgcolor=#E9E9E9
| 515267 ||  || — || September 17, 2012 || Kitt Peak || Spacewatch || EUN || align=right | 1.0 km || 
|-id=268 bgcolor=#fefefe
| 515268 ||  || — || September 12, 2012 || La Sagra || OAM Obs. ||  || align=right data-sort-value="0.93" | 930 m || 
|-id=269 bgcolor=#fefefe
| 515269 ||  || — || May 3, 2008 || Kitt Peak || Spacewatch ||  || align=right data-sort-value="0.66" | 660 m || 
|-id=270 bgcolor=#fefefe
| 515270 ||  || — || April 29, 2011 || Mount Lemmon || Mount Lemmon Survey ||  || align=right data-sort-value="0.68" | 680 m || 
|-id=271 bgcolor=#E9E9E9
| 515271 ||  || — || December 3, 2008 || Catalina || CSS ||  || align=right | 1.5 km || 
|-id=272 bgcolor=#E9E9E9
| 515272 ||  || — || October 22, 1995 || Kitt Peak || Spacewatch ||  || align=right data-sort-value="0.89" | 890 m || 
|-id=273 bgcolor=#E9E9E9
| 515273 ||  || — || October 6, 2012 || Kitt Peak || Spacewatch ||  || align=right | 1.3 km || 
|-id=274 bgcolor=#fefefe
| 515274 ||  || — || September 15, 2012 || Kitt Peak || Spacewatch ||  || align=right data-sort-value="0.69" | 690 m || 
|-id=275 bgcolor=#fefefe
| 515275 ||  || — || March 14, 2011 || Mount Lemmon || Mount Lemmon Survey || V || align=right data-sort-value="0.59" | 590 m || 
|-id=276 bgcolor=#fefefe
| 515276 ||  || — || September 28, 1997 || Kitt Peak || Spacewatch ||  || align=right data-sort-value="0.82" | 820 m || 
|-id=277 bgcolor=#fefefe
| 515277 ||  || — || April 15, 2007 || Mount Lemmon || Mount Lemmon Survey ||  || align=right data-sort-value="0.90" | 900 m || 
|-id=278 bgcolor=#E9E9E9
| 515278 ||  || — || November 3, 2008 || Kitt Peak || Spacewatch ||  || align=right data-sort-value="0.94" | 940 m || 
|-id=279 bgcolor=#fefefe
| 515279 ||  || — || October 8, 2012 || Haleakala || Pan-STARRS ||  || align=right data-sort-value="0.71" | 710 m || 
|-id=280 bgcolor=#E9E9E9
| 515280 ||  || — || October 6, 2008 || Mount Lemmon || Mount Lemmon Survey ||  || align=right data-sort-value="0.77" | 770 m || 
|-id=281 bgcolor=#E9E9E9
| 515281 ||  || — || October 8, 2012 || Haleakala || Pan-STARRS ||  || align=right data-sort-value="0.82" | 820 m || 
|-id=282 bgcolor=#FA8072
| 515282 ||  || — || August 28, 2005 || Kitt Peak || Spacewatch ||  || align=right data-sort-value="0.65" | 650 m || 
|-id=283 bgcolor=#E9E9E9
| 515283 ||  || — || March 4, 2005 || Kitt Peak || Spacewatch ||  || align=right | 1.2 km || 
|-id=284 bgcolor=#fefefe
| 515284 ||  || — || October 5, 2012 || Haleakala || Pan-STARRS || V || align=right data-sort-value="0.74" | 740 m || 
|-id=285 bgcolor=#fefefe
| 515285 ||  || — || April 30, 2011 || Haleakala || Pan-STARRS ||  || align=right data-sort-value="0.87" | 870 m || 
|-id=286 bgcolor=#fefefe
| 515286 ||  || — || October 8, 2012 || Mount Lemmon || Mount Lemmon Survey ||  || align=right data-sort-value="0.75" | 750 m || 
|-id=287 bgcolor=#fefefe
| 515287 ||  || — || October 8, 2005 || Kitt Peak || Spacewatch ||  || align=right data-sort-value="0.68" | 680 m || 
|-id=288 bgcolor=#fefefe
| 515288 ||  || — || July 30, 2008 || Kitt Peak || Spacewatch ||  || align=right data-sort-value="0.81" | 810 m || 
|-id=289 bgcolor=#fefefe
| 515289 ||  || — || January 8, 2010 || Mount Lemmon || Mount Lemmon Survey ||  || align=right data-sort-value="0.82" | 820 m || 
|-id=290 bgcolor=#fefefe
| 515290 ||  || — || October 8, 2012 || Haleakala || Pan-STARRS ||  || align=right data-sort-value="0.77" | 770 m || 
|-id=291 bgcolor=#fefefe
| 515291 ||  || — || August 21, 2008 || Kitt Peak || Spacewatch ||  || align=right data-sort-value="0.90" | 900 m || 
|-id=292 bgcolor=#E9E9E9
| 515292 ||  || — || September 17, 2012 || Catalina || CSS ||  || align=right | 1.3 km || 
|-id=293 bgcolor=#fefefe
| 515293 ||  || — || September 15, 2012 || Kitt Peak || Spacewatch || SUL || align=right | 2.1 km || 
|-id=294 bgcolor=#fefefe
| 515294 ||  || — || October 28, 2005 || Kitt Peak || Spacewatch || MAS || align=right data-sort-value="0.64" | 640 m || 
|-id=295 bgcolor=#fefefe
| 515295 ||  || — || April 28, 2011 || Haleakala || Pan-STARRS ||  || align=right | 1.1 km || 
|-id=296 bgcolor=#E9E9E9
| 515296 ||  || — || September 19, 2012 || Mount Lemmon || Mount Lemmon Survey ||  || align=right | 1.2 km || 
|-id=297 bgcolor=#E9E9E9
| 515297 ||  || — || September 22, 2008 || Mount Lemmon || Mount Lemmon Survey ||  || align=right data-sort-value="0.78" | 780 m || 
|-id=298 bgcolor=#E9E9E9
| 515298 ||  || — || October 18, 2012 || Haleakala || Pan-STARRS ||  || align=right | 1.1 km || 
|-id=299 bgcolor=#E9E9E9
| 515299 ||  || — || December 25, 2008 || La Sagra || OAM Obs. ||  || align=right | 1.7 km || 
|-id=300 bgcolor=#E9E9E9
| 515300 ||  || — || October 10, 2012 || Mount Lemmon || Mount Lemmon Survey ||  || align=right | 1.4 km || 
|}

515301–515400 

|-bgcolor=#E9E9E9
| 515301 ||  || — || October 28, 2008 || Kitt Peak || Spacewatch ||  || align=right data-sort-value="0.94" | 940 m || 
|-id=302 bgcolor=#E9E9E9
| 515302 ||  || — || October 9, 2012 || Mount Lemmon || Mount Lemmon Survey ||  || align=right data-sort-value="0.98" | 980 m || 
|-id=303 bgcolor=#E9E9E9
| 515303 ||  || — || October 17, 2012 || Mount Lemmon || Mount Lemmon Survey ||  || align=right data-sort-value="0.84" | 840 m || 
|-id=304 bgcolor=#fefefe
| 515304 ||  || — || March 25, 2011 || Haleakala || Pan-STARRS ||  || align=right data-sort-value="0.89" | 890 m || 
|-id=305 bgcolor=#E9E9E9
| 515305 ||  || — || October 26, 2012 || Mount Lemmon || Mount Lemmon Survey ||  || align=right data-sort-value="0.86" | 860 m || 
|-id=306 bgcolor=#E9E9E9
| 515306 ||  || — || October 27, 2008 || Kitt Peak || Spacewatch ||  || align=right data-sort-value="0.71" | 710 m || 
|-id=307 bgcolor=#fefefe
| 515307 ||  || — || October 1, 2005 || Kitt Peak || Spacewatch ||  || align=right data-sort-value="0.64" | 640 m || 
|-id=308 bgcolor=#fefefe
| 515308 ||  || — || October 21, 2012 || Haleakala || Pan-STARRS ||  || align=right data-sort-value="0.84" | 840 m || 
|-id=309 bgcolor=#E9E9E9
| 515309 ||  || — || October 21, 2012 || Haleakala || Pan-STARRS ||  || align=right data-sort-value="0.88" | 880 m || 
|-id=310 bgcolor=#E9E9E9
| 515310 ||  || — || October 21, 2012 || Haleakala || Pan-STARRS ||  || align=right | 1.2 km || 
|-id=311 bgcolor=#E9E9E9
| 515311 ||  || — || October 26, 2012 || Haleakala || Pan-STARRS ||  || align=right | 1.3 km || 
|-id=312 bgcolor=#E9E9E9
| 515312 ||  || — || November 17, 2012 || Kitt Peak || Spacewatch ||  || align=right | 1.1 km || 
|-id=313 bgcolor=#E9E9E9
| 515313 ||  || — || November 26, 2012 || Mount Lemmon || Mount Lemmon Survey ||  || align=right | 1.7 km || 
|-id=314 bgcolor=#E9E9E9
| 515314 ||  || — || November 14, 2012 || Mount Lemmon || Mount Lemmon Survey ||  || align=right data-sort-value="0.91" | 910 m || 
|-id=315 bgcolor=#E9E9E9
| 515315 ||  || — || April 27, 2009 || Catalina || CSS ||  || align=right | 2.4 km || 
|-id=316 bgcolor=#E9E9E9
| 515316 ||  || — || December 1, 2008 || Mount Lemmon || Mount Lemmon Survey ||  || align=right | 1.3 km || 
|-id=317 bgcolor=#E9E9E9
| 515317 ||  || — || September 19, 2003 || Kitt Peak || Spacewatch ||  || align=right | 1.5 km || 
|-id=318 bgcolor=#E9E9E9
| 515318 ||  || — || December 5, 2012 || Mount Lemmon || Mount Lemmon Survey ||  || align=right | 1.8 km || 
|-id=319 bgcolor=#E9E9E9
| 515319 ||  || — || December 2, 2008 || Kitt Peak || Spacewatch ||  || align=right | 1.0 km || 
|-id=320 bgcolor=#fefefe
| 515320 ||  || — || June 2, 2011 || Haleakala || Pan-STARRS ||  || align=right data-sort-value="0.93" | 930 m || 
|-id=321 bgcolor=#E9E9E9
| 515321 ||  || — || November 25, 2012 || Kitt Peak || Spacewatch ||  || align=right data-sort-value="0.85" | 850 m || 
|-id=322 bgcolor=#E9E9E9
| 515322 ||  || — || December 8, 2012 || Mount Lemmon || Mount Lemmon Survey ||  || align=right | 1.7 km || 
|-id=323 bgcolor=#E9E9E9
| 515323 ||  || — || November 7, 2012 || Mount Lemmon || Mount Lemmon Survey || LEO || align=right | 1.3 km || 
|-id=324 bgcolor=#E9E9E9
| 515324 ||  || — || December 17, 2003 || Kitt Peak || Spacewatch ||  || align=right | 1.9 km || 
|-id=325 bgcolor=#E9E9E9
| 515325 ||  || — || November 11, 2012 || Catalina || CSS ||  || align=right | 1.2 km || 
|-id=326 bgcolor=#E9E9E9
| 515326 ||  || — || November 2, 2008 || Mount Lemmon || Mount Lemmon Survey ||  || align=right | 1.3 km || 
|-id=327 bgcolor=#E9E9E9
| 515327 ||  || — || December 18, 2004 || Kitt Peak || Spacewatch ||  || align=right | 1.2 km || 
|-id=328 bgcolor=#E9E9E9
| 515328 ||  || — || January 28, 2004 || Kitt Peak || Spacewatch ||  || align=right | 2.1 km || 
|-id=329 bgcolor=#d6d6d6
| 515329 ||  || — || December 12, 2012 || Kitt Peak || Spacewatch ||  || align=right | 2.5 km || 
|-id=330 bgcolor=#E9E9E9
| 515330 ||  || — || January 7, 2013 || Mount Lemmon || Mount Lemmon Survey ||  || align=right | 1.9 km || 
|-id=331 bgcolor=#E9E9E9
| 515331 ||  || — || November 9, 2007 || Kitt Peak || Spacewatch || AEO || align=right | 1.1 km || 
|-id=332 bgcolor=#E9E9E9
| 515332 ||  || — || March 21, 2004 || Kitt Peak || Spacewatch ||  || align=right | 1.5 km || 
|-id=333 bgcolor=#E9E9E9
| 515333 ||  || — || April 20, 2009 || Kitt Peak || Spacewatch ||  || align=right | 2.1 km || 
|-id=334 bgcolor=#E9E9E9
| 515334 ||  || — || November 16, 2007 || Mount Lemmon || Mount Lemmon Survey ||  || align=right | 2.3 km || 
|-id=335 bgcolor=#FFC2E0
| 515335 ||  || — || January 9, 2013 || Mount Lemmon || Mount Lemmon Survey || AMO || align=right data-sort-value="0.62" | 620 m || 
|-id=336 bgcolor=#E9E9E9
| 515336 ||  || — || February 13, 2004 || Kitt Peak || Spacewatch || DOR || align=right | 2.0 km || 
|-id=337 bgcolor=#E9E9E9
| 515337 ||  || — || December 22, 2012 || Haleakala || Pan-STARRS ||  || align=right | 1.4 km || 
|-id=338 bgcolor=#E9E9E9
| 515338 ||  || — || September 24, 2011 || Haleakala || Pan-STARRS ||  || align=right | 2.1 km || 
|-id=339 bgcolor=#E9E9E9
| 515339 ||  || — || June 13, 2005 || Kitt Peak || Spacewatch || JUN || align=right | 1.0 km || 
|-id=340 bgcolor=#E9E9E9
| 515340 ||  || — || August 27, 2011 || Haleakala || Pan-STARRS ||  || align=right | 1.2 km || 
|-id=341 bgcolor=#E9E9E9
| 515341 ||  || — || January 10, 2013 || Haleakala || Pan-STARRS ||  || align=right | 1.8 km || 
|-id=342 bgcolor=#E9E9E9
| 515342 ||  || — || November 18, 2007 || Kitt Peak || Spacewatch ||  || align=right | 1.3 km || 
|-id=343 bgcolor=#E9E9E9
| 515343 ||  || — || January 4, 2013 || Mount Lemmon || Mount Lemmon Survey ||  || align=right | 1.7 km || 
|-id=344 bgcolor=#E9E9E9
| 515344 ||  || — || January 5, 2013 || Mount Lemmon || Mount Lemmon Survey ||  || align=right | 1.4 km || 
|-id=345 bgcolor=#E9E9E9
| 515345 ||  || — || October 30, 2011 || Mount Lemmon || Mount Lemmon Survey ||  || align=right | 2.0 km || 
|-id=346 bgcolor=#E9E9E9
| 515346 ||  || — || January 10, 2013 || Haleakala || Pan-STARRS ||  || align=right | 1.7 km || 
|-id=347 bgcolor=#E9E9E9
| 515347 ||  || — || September 8, 2011 || Haleakala || Pan-STARRS ||  || align=right | 2.4 km || 
|-id=348 bgcolor=#E9E9E9
| 515348 ||  || — || September 26, 2011 || Haleakala || Pan-STARRS || NEM || align=right | 2.3 km || 
|-id=349 bgcolor=#E9E9E9
| 515349 ||  || — || February 16, 2004 || Kitt Peak || Spacewatch ||  || align=right | 1.7 km || 
|-id=350 bgcolor=#E9E9E9
| 515350 ||  || — || January 10, 2013 || Haleakala || Pan-STARRS ||  || align=right | 1.6 km || 
|-id=351 bgcolor=#E9E9E9
| 515351 ||  || — || April 18, 2009 || Kitt Peak || Spacewatch ||  || align=right | 1.7 km || 
|-id=352 bgcolor=#E9E9E9
| 515352 ||  || — || October 4, 2006 || Mount Lemmon || Mount Lemmon Survey ||  || align=right | 2.1 km || 
|-id=353 bgcolor=#E9E9E9
| 515353 ||  || — || February 5, 2013 || Kitt Peak || Spacewatch ||  || align=right | 1.9 km || 
|-id=354 bgcolor=#E9E9E9
| 515354 ||  || — || September 23, 2011 || Haleakala || Pan-STARRS ||  || align=right | 1.9 km || 
|-id=355 bgcolor=#E9E9E9
| 515355 ||  || — || October 24, 2011 || Haleakala || Pan-STARRS || AEO || align=right | 1.2 km || 
|-id=356 bgcolor=#E9E9E9
| 515356 ||  || — || February 9, 2013 || Haleakala || Pan-STARRS ||  || align=right | 2.1 km || 
|-id=357 bgcolor=#E9E9E9
| 515357 ||  || — || September 29, 2011 || Kitt Peak || Spacewatch || GEF || align=right | 1.1 km || 
|-id=358 bgcolor=#E9E9E9
| 515358 ||  || — || September 17, 1996 || Kitt Peak || Spacewatch || GEF || align=right | 1.3 km || 
|-id=359 bgcolor=#d6d6d6
| 515359 ||  || — || February 10, 2008 || Mount Lemmon || Mount Lemmon Survey ||  || align=right | 2.1 km || 
|-id=360 bgcolor=#E9E9E9
| 515360 ||  || — || January 11, 2008 || Kitt Peak || Spacewatch ||  || align=right | 2.0 km || 
|-id=361 bgcolor=#d6d6d6
| 515361 ||  || — || March 27, 2008 || Kitt Peak || Spacewatch || KOR || align=right | 1.3 km || 
|-id=362 bgcolor=#E9E9E9
| 515362 ||  || — || September 15, 2006 || Kitt Peak || Spacewatch || GEF || align=right | 1.1 km || 
|-id=363 bgcolor=#d6d6d6
| 515363 ||  || — || December 8, 2012 || Mount Lemmon || Mount Lemmon Survey ||  || align=right | 2.2 km || 
|-id=364 bgcolor=#E9E9E9
| 515364 ||  || — || October 31, 2011 || Mount Lemmon || Mount Lemmon Survey ||  || align=right | 2.0 km || 
|-id=365 bgcolor=#d6d6d6
| 515365 ||  || — || April 24, 2007 || Mount Lemmon || Mount Lemmon Survey ||  || align=right | 2.5 km || 
|-id=366 bgcolor=#fefefe
| 515366 ||  || — || February 3, 2013 || Haleakala || Pan-STARRS || H || align=right data-sort-value="0.65" | 650 m || 
|-id=367 bgcolor=#d6d6d6
| 515367 ||  || — || March 9, 2003 || Kitt Peak || Spacewatch ||  || align=right | 2.5 km || 
|-id=368 bgcolor=#d6d6d6
| 515368 ||  || — || February 11, 2008 || Kitt Peak || Spacewatch ||  || align=right | 2.4 km || 
|-id=369 bgcolor=#d6d6d6
| 515369 ||  || — || March 8, 2008 || Kitt Peak || Spacewatch ||  || align=right | 2.6 km || 
|-id=370 bgcolor=#d6d6d6
| 515370 ||  || — || April 14, 2008 || Mount Lemmon || Mount Lemmon Survey ||  || align=right | 2.7 km || 
|-id=371 bgcolor=#fefefe
| 515371 ||  || — || February 18, 2008 || Mount Lemmon || Mount Lemmon Survey || H || align=right data-sort-value="0.47" | 470 m || 
|-id=372 bgcolor=#d6d6d6
| 515372 ||  || — || March 8, 2013 || Haleakala || Pan-STARRS ||  || align=right | 3.6 km || 
|-id=373 bgcolor=#d6d6d6
| 515373 ||  || — || February 28, 2008 || Kitt Peak || Spacewatch ||  || align=right | 1.9 km || 
|-id=374 bgcolor=#d6d6d6
| 515374 ||  || — || November 27, 2011 || Mount Lemmon || Mount Lemmon Survey || KOR || align=right | 1.1 km || 
|-id=375 bgcolor=#d6d6d6
| 515375 ||  || — || February 28, 2008 || Kitt Peak || Spacewatch ||  || align=right | 1.6 km || 
|-id=376 bgcolor=#d6d6d6
| 515376 ||  || — || March 27, 2008 || Kitt Peak || Spacewatch ||  || align=right | 2.5 km || 
|-id=377 bgcolor=#d6d6d6
| 515377 ||  || — || February 7, 2008 || Mount Lemmon || Mount Lemmon Survey ||  || align=right | 1.6 km || 
|-id=378 bgcolor=#d6d6d6
| 515378 ||  || — || December 21, 2006 || Mount Lemmon || Mount Lemmon Survey || EOS || align=right | 1.7 km || 
|-id=379 bgcolor=#d6d6d6
| 515379 ||  || — || February 15, 2013 || Haleakala || Pan-STARRS ||  || align=right | 2.4 km || 
|-id=380 bgcolor=#d6d6d6
| 515380 ||  || — || February 28, 2008 || Mount Lemmon || Mount Lemmon Survey ||  || align=right | 1.9 km || 
|-id=381 bgcolor=#d6d6d6
| 515381 ||  || — || October 7, 2005 || Mount Lemmon || Mount Lemmon Survey ||  || align=right | 2.0 km || 
|-id=382 bgcolor=#d6d6d6
| 515382 ||  || — || November 11, 2006 || Mount Lemmon || Mount Lemmon Survey ||  || align=right | 2.0 km || 
|-id=383 bgcolor=#d6d6d6
| 515383 ||  || — || April 11, 2008 || Mount Lemmon || Mount Lemmon Survey ||  || align=right | 2.6 km || 
|-id=384 bgcolor=#FA8072
| 515384 ||  || — || March 31, 2008 || Mount Lemmon || Mount Lemmon Survey || H || align=right data-sort-value="0.58" | 580 m || 
|-id=385 bgcolor=#d6d6d6
| 515385 ||  || — || March 31, 2008 || Kitt Peak || Spacewatch ||  || align=right | 2.1 km || 
|-id=386 bgcolor=#fefefe
| 515386 ||  || — || March 16, 2013 || Kitt Peak || Spacewatch || H || align=right data-sort-value="0.78" | 780 m || 
|-id=387 bgcolor=#d6d6d6
| 515387 ||  || — || May 5, 2008 || Kitt Peak || Spacewatch ||  || align=right | 2.0 km || 
|-id=388 bgcolor=#d6d6d6
| 515388 ||  || — || October 22, 2005 || Kitt Peak || Spacewatch ||  || align=right | 2.5 km || 
|-id=389 bgcolor=#d6d6d6
| 515389 ||  || — || April 26, 2008 || Kitt Peak || Spacewatch ||  || align=right | 2.6 km || 
|-id=390 bgcolor=#d6d6d6
| 515390 ||  || — || April 5, 2013 || Haleakala || Pan-STARRS ||  || align=right | 2.2 km || 
|-id=391 bgcolor=#d6d6d6
| 515391 ||  || — || August 27, 2009 || Kitt Peak || Spacewatch ||  || align=right | 2.2 km || 
|-id=392 bgcolor=#d6d6d6
| 515392 ||  || — || March 19, 2013 || Haleakala || Pan-STARRS ||  || align=right | 2.2 km || 
|-id=393 bgcolor=#d6d6d6
| 515393 ||  || — || April 30, 2008 || Mount Lemmon || Mount Lemmon Survey ||  || align=right | 2.3 km || 
|-id=394 bgcolor=#d6d6d6
| 515394 ||  || — || April 6, 2013 || Haleakala || Pan-STARRS ||  || align=right | 2.9 km || 
|-id=395 bgcolor=#d6d6d6
| 515395 ||  || — || April 14, 2008 || Mount Lemmon || Mount Lemmon Survey ||  || align=right | 2.4 km || 
|-id=396 bgcolor=#fefefe
| 515396 ||  || — || April 25, 2008 || Kitt Peak || Spacewatch || H || align=right data-sort-value="0.71" | 710 m || 
|-id=397 bgcolor=#d6d6d6
| 515397 ||  || — || December 29, 2011 || Kitt Peak || Spacewatch ||  || align=right | 2.8 km || 
|-id=398 bgcolor=#d6d6d6
| 515398 ||  || — || October 27, 2009 || Mount Lemmon || Mount Lemmon Survey ||  || align=right | 2.8 km || 
|-id=399 bgcolor=#d6d6d6
| 515399 ||  || — || March 6, 2008 || Mount Lemmon || Mount Lemmon Survey ||  || align=right | 2.4 km || 
|-id=400 bgcolor=#d6d6d6
| 515400 ||  || — || February 21, 2007 || Mount Lemmon || Mount Lemmon Survey || THM || align=right | 2.1 km || 
|}

515401–515500 

|-bgcolor=#d6d6d6
| 515401 ||  || — || March 28, 2008 || Mount Lemmon || Mount Lemmon Survey ||  || align=right | 2.0 km || 
|-id=402 bgcolor=#d6d6d6
| 515402 ||  || — || April 13, 2013 || Haleakala || Pan-STARRS ||  || align=right | 2.3 km || 
|-id=403 bgcolor=#d6d6d6
| 515403 ||  || — || March 12, 2013 || Mount Lemmon || Mount Lemmon Survey ||  || align=right | 2.7 km || 
|-id=404 bgcolor=#d6d6d6
| 515404 ||  || — || April 11, 2013 || Kitt Peak || Spacewatch ||  || align=right | 2.2 km || 
|-id=405 bgcolor=#fefefe
| 515405 ||  || — || April 10, 2013 || Catalina || CSS || H || align=right data-sort-value="0.60" | 600 m || 
|-id=406 bgcolor=#fefefe
| 515406 ||  || — || August 24, 2011 || La Sagra || OAM Obs. || H || align=right data-sort-value="0.57" | 570 m || 
|-id=407 bgcolor=#fefefe
| 515407 ||  || — || March 2, 2005 || Kitt Peak || Spacewatch || H || align=right data-sort-value="0.68" | 680 m || 
|-id=408 bgcolor=#d6d6d6
| 515408 ||  || — || April 13, 2013 || Haleakala || Pan-STARRS ||  || align=right | 3.1 km || 
|-id=409 bgcolor=#d6d6d6
| 515409 ||  || — || May 2, 2008 || Mount Lemmon || Mount Lemmon Survey ||  || align=right | 2.4 km || 
|-id=410 bgcolor=#d6d6d6
| 515410 ||  || — || February 21, 2007 || Kitt Peak || Spacewatch ||  || align=right | 2.8 km || 
|-id=411 bgcolor=#d6d6d6
| 515411 ||  || — || April 9, 2013 || Haleakala || Pan-STARRS ||  || align=right | 3.6 km || 
|-id=412 bgcolor=#d6d6d6
| 515412 ||  || — || September 20, 2009 || Mount Lemmon || Mount Lemmon Survey ||  || align=right | 2.2 km || 
|-id=413 bgcolor=#d6d6d6
| 515413 ||  || — || April 9, 2013 || Haleakala || Pan-STARRS ||  || align=right | 2.0 km || 
|-id=414 bgcolor=#d6d6d6
| 515414 ||  || — || April 9, 2013 || Haleakala || Pan-STARRS || EOS || align=right | 1.4 km || 
|-id=415 bgcolor=#d6d6d6
| 515415 ||  || — || April 9, 2013 || Haleakala || Pan-STARRS ||  || align=right | 2.1 km || 
|-id=416 bgcolor=#d6d6d6
| 515416 ||  || — || April 9, 2013 || Haleakala || Pan-STARRS ||  || align=right | 2.7 km || 
|-id=417 bgcolor=#d6d6d6
| 515417 ||  || — || November 27, 2010 || Mount Lemmon || Mount Lemmon Survey ||  || align=right | 2.3 km || 
|-id=418 bgcolor=#d6d6d6
| 515418 ||  || — || September 30, 2005 || Kitt Peak || Spacewatch ||  || align=right | 2.2 km || 
|-id=419 bgcolor=#d6d6d6
| 515419 ||  || — || October 20, 1993 || Kitt Peak || Spacewatch ||  || align=right | 2.2 km || 
|-id=420 bgcolor=#d6d6d6
| 515420 ||  || — || October 2, 2010 || Kitt Peak || Spacewatch || THM || align=right | 2.0 km || 
|-id=421 bgcolor=#d6d6d6
| 515421 ||  || — || October 9, 2005 || Kitt Peak || Spacewatch ||  || align=right | 2.0 km || 
|-id=422 bgcolor=#d6d6d6
| 515422 ||  || — || April 9, 2013 || Haleakala || Pan-STARRS ||  || align=right | 2.2 km || 
|-id=423 bgcolor=#d6d6d6
| 515423 ||  || — || April 29, 2008 || Mount Lemmon || Mount Lemmon Survey ||  || align=right | 2.0 km || 
|-id=424 bgcolor=#d6d6d6
| 515424 ||  || — || March 12, 2007 || Kitt Peak || Spacewatch ||  || align=right | 2.6 km || 
|-id=425 bgcolor=#d6d6d6
| 515425 ||  || — || October 11, 2004 || Kitt Peak || Spacewatch ||  || align=right | 2.1 km || 
|-id=426 bgcolor=#d6d6d6
| 515426 ||  || — || April 9, 2013 || Haleakala || Pan-STARRS || THM || align=right | 1.9 km || 
|-id=427 bgcolor=#d6d6d6
| 515427 ||  || — || February 3, 2012 || Haleakala || Pan-STARRS ||  || align=right | 2.1 km || 
|-id=428 bgcolor=#d6d6d6
| 515428 ||  || — || March 10, 2007 || Mount Lemmon || Mount Lemmon Survey ||  || align=right | 2.3 km || 
|-id=429 bgcolor=#d6d6d6
| 515429 ||  || — || February 14, 2013 || Haleakala || Pan-STARRS ||  || align=right | 2.5 km || 
|-id=430 bgcolor=#d6d6d6
| 515430 ||  || — || April 2, 2013 || Mount Lemmon || Mount Lemmon Survey ||  || align=right | 2.8 km || 
|-id=431 bgcolor=#d6d6d6
| 515431 ||  || — || April 15, 2013 || Haleakala || Pan-STARRS ||  || align=right | 2.7 km || 
|-id=432 bgcolor=#d6d6d6
| 515432 ||  || — || April 15, 2013 || Haleakala || Pan-STARRS || EOS || align=right | 1.6 km || 
|-id=433 bgcolor=#d6d6d6
| 515433 ||  || — || April 15, 2013 || Haleakala || Pan-STARRS ||  || align=right | 2.7 km || 
|-id=434 bgcolor=#d6d6d6
| 515434 ||  || — || April 15, 2013 || Haleakala || Pan-STARRS || THM || align=right | 2.2 km || 
|-id=435 bgcolor=#fefefe
| 515435 ||  || — || March 17, 2005 || Kitt Peak || Spacewatch || H || align=right data-sort-value="0.66" | 660 m || 
|-id=436 bgcolor=#fefefe
| 515436 ||  || — || May 31, 2013 || Haleakala || Pan-STARRS || H || align=right data-sort-value="0.59" | 590 m || 
|-id=437 bgcolor=#d6d6d6
| 515437 ||  || — || March 14, 2007 || Kitt Peak || Spacewatch || HYG || align=right | 2.6 km || 
|-id=438 bgcolor=#fefefe
| 515438 ||  || — || May 18, 2013 || Mount Lemmon || Mount Lemmon Survey || H || align=right data-sort-value="0.58" | 580 m || 
|-id=439 bgcolor=#fefefe
| 515439 ||  || — || July 17, 2013 || Haleakala || Pan-STARRS || H || align=right data-sort-value="0.79" | 790 m || 
|-id=440 bgcolor=#d6d6d6
| 515440 ||  || — || September 28, 1997 || Kitt Peak || Spacewatch || 3:2 || align=right | 4.2 km || 
|-id=441 bgcolor=#d6d6d6
| 515441 ||  || — || October 1, 2005 || Kitt Peak || Spacewatch || 3:2 || align=right | 4.4 km || 
|-id=442 bgcolor=#C2FFFF
| 515442 ||  || — || September 1, 2013 || Mount Lemmon || Mount Lemmon Survey || L5 || align=right | 7.9 km || 
|-id=443 bgcolor=#fefefe
| 515443 ||  || — || October 27, 2006 || Mount Lemmon || Mount Lemmon Survey ||  || align=right data-sort-value="0.56" | 560 m || 
|-id=444 bgcolor=#fefefe
| 515444 ||  || — || October 1, 2006 || Kitt Peak || Spacewatch ||  || align=right data-sort-value="0.52" | 520 m || 
|-id=445 bgcolor=#C2FFFF
| 515445 ||  || — || October 9, 2013 || Mount Lemmon || Mount Lemmon Survey || L5 || align=right | 7.8 km || 
|-id=446 bgcolor=#FFC2E0
| 515446 ||  || — || October 25, 2013 || Haleakala || Pan-STARRS || AMO || align=right data-sort-value="0.30" | 300 m || 
|-id=447 bgcolor=#C2FFFF
| 515447 ||  || — || October 26, 2013 || Kitt Peak || Spacewatch || L5 || align=right | 9.1 km || 
|-id=448 bgcolor=#C2FFFF
| 515448 ||  || — || August 24, 2011 || Haleakala || Pan-STARRS || L5 || align=right | 11 km || 
|-id=449 bgcolor=#C2FFFF
| 515449 ||  || — || June 4, 2011 || Mount Lemmon || Mount Lemmon Survey || L5 || align=right | 9.6 km || 
|-id=450 bgcolor=#C2FFFF
| 515450 ||  || — || November 27, 2013 || Haleakala || Pan-STARRS || L5 || align=right | 9.1 km || 
|-id=451 bgcolor=#fefefe
| 515451 ||  || — || January 30, 2011 || Kitt Peak || Spacewatch ||  || align=right data-sort-value="0.91" | 910 m || 
|-id=452 bgcolor=#fefefe
| 515452 ||  || — || November 14, 2006 || Kitt Peak || Spacewatch ||  || align=right data-sort-value="0.47" | 470 m || 
|-id=453 bgcolor=#fefefe
| 515453 ||  || — || October 28, 2006 || Mount Lemmon || Mount Lemmon Survey ||  || align=right data-sort-value="0.69" | 690 m || 
|-id=454 bgcolor=#fefefe
| 515454 ||  || — || October 30, 2013 || Kitt Peak || Spacewatch ||  || align=right data-sort-value="0.86" | 860 m || 
|-id=455 bgcolor=#C2FFFF
| 515455 ||  || — || July 14, 2013 || Haleakala || Pan-STARRS || L5 || align=right | 7.5 km || 
|-id=456 bgcolor=#fefefe
| 515456 ||  || — || October 23, 2006 || Mount Lemmon || Mount Lemmon Survey ||  || align=right data-sort-value="0.57" | 570 m || 
|-id=457 bgcolor=#fefefe
| 515457 ||  || — || May 1, 2011 || Haleakala || Pan-STARRS ||  || align=right data-sort-value="0.77" | 770 m || 
|-id=458 bgcolor=#fefefe
| 515458 ||  || — || December 24, 2013 || Mount Lemmon || Mount Lemmon Survey || NYS || align=right data-sort-value="0.58" | 580 m || 
|-id=459 bgcolor=#fefefe
| 515459 ||  || — || February 23, 2007 || Kitt Peak || Spacewatch ||  || align=right data-sort-value="0.65" | 650 m || 
|-id=460 bgcolor=#fefefe
| 515460 ||  || — || February 29, 2004 || Kitt Peak || Spacewatch ||  || align=right data-sort-value="0.57" | 570 m || 
|-id=461 bgcolor=#fefefe
| 515461 ||  || — || December 24, 2013 || Mount Lemmon || Mount Lemmon Survey ||  || align=right data-sort-value="0.68" | 680 m || 
|-id=462 bgcolor=#fefefe
| 515462 ||  || — || December 24, 2006 || Kitt Peak || Spacewatch || NYS || align=right data-sort-value="0.54" | 540 m || 
|-id=463 bgcolor=#fefefe
| 515463 ||  || — || October 25, 2005 || Kitt Peak || Spacewatch ||  || align=right data-sort-value="0.82" | 820 m || 
|-id=464 bgcolor=#fefefe
| 515464 ||  || — || November 9, 2009 || Mount Lemmon || Mount Lemmon Survey ||  || align=right data-sort-value="0.59" | 590 m || 
|-id=465 bgcolor=#fefefe
| 515465 ||  || — || January 25, 2007 || Kitt Peak || Spacewatch || (2076) || align=right data-sort-value="0.65" | 650 m || 
|-id=466 bgcolor=#fefefe
| 515466 ||  || — || November 18, 2009 || Kitt Peak || Spacewatch ||  || align=right data-sort-value="0.59" | 590 m || 
|-id=467 bgcolor=#fefefe
| 515467 ||  || — || December 30, 2013 || Kitt Peak || Spacewatch ||  || align=right data-sort-value="0.74" | 740 m || 
|-id=468 bgcolor=#fefefe
| 515468 ||  || — || February 21, 2007 || Kitt Peak || Spacewatch || NYS || align=right data-sort-value="0.60" | 600 m || 
|-id=469 bgcolor=#fefefe
| 515469 ||  || — || May 25, 2007 || Mount Lemmon || Mount Lemmon Survey ||  || align=right data-sort-value="0.81" | 810 m || 
|-id=470 bgcolor=#fefefe
| 515470 ||  || — || April 15, 2007 || Kitt Peak || Spacewatch ||  || align=right data-sort-value="0.65" | 650 m || 
|-id=471 bgcolor=#fefefe
| 515471 ||  || — || March 9, 2007 || Mount Lemmon || Mount Lemmon Survey || MAS || align=right data-sort-value="0.61" | 610 m || 
|-id=472 bgcolor=#fefefe
| 515472 ||  || — || March 31, 2010 || WISE || WISE ||  || align=right | 1.0 km || 
|-id=473 bgcolor=#fefefe
| 515473 ||  || — || December 14, 2013 || Haleakala || Pan-STARRS ||  || align=right | 1.2 km || 
|-id=474 bgcolor=#fefefe
| 515474 ||  || — || March 14, 2007 || Kitt Peak || Spacewatch ||  || align=right data-sort-value="0.72" | 720 m || 
|-id=475 bgcolor=#fefefe
| 515475 ||  || — || April 3, 2011 || Haleakala || Pan-STARRS ||  || align=right data-sort-value="0.59" | 590 m || 
|-id=476 bgcolor=#E9E9E9
| 515476 ||  || — || March 23, 2001 || Anderson Mesa || LONEOS ||  || align=right | 1.8 km || 
|-id=477 bgcolor=#fefefe
| 515477 ||  || — || December 30, 2013 || Mount Lemmon || Mount Lemmon Survey ||  || align=right data-sort-value="0.63" | 630 m || 
|-id=478 bgcolor=#fefefe
| 515478 ||  || — || April 14, 2007 || Mount Lemmon || Mount Lemmon Survey || NYS || align=right data-sort-value="0.60" | 600 m || 
|-id=479 bgcolor=#fefefe
| 515479 ||  || — || April 22, 2007 || Kitt Peak || Spacewatch || MAS || align=right data-sort-value="0.65" | 650 m || 
|-id=480 bgcolor=#fefefe
| 515480 ||  || — || January 1, 2014 || Haleakala || Pan-STARRS ||  || align=right data-sort-value="0.78" | 780 m || 
|-id=481 bgcolor=#fefefe
| 515481 ||  || — || October 30, 2005 || Kitt Peak || Spacewatch || NYS || align=right data-sort-value="0.63" | 630 m || 
|-id=482 bgcolor=#fefefe
| 515482 ||  || — || February 8, 2007 || Kitt Peak || Spacewatch ||  || align=right data-sort-value="0.63" | 630 m || 
|-id=483 bgcolor=#fefefe
| 515483 ||  || — || April 20, 2007 || Kitt Peak || Spacewatch ||  || align=right data-sort-value="0.66" | 660 m || 
|-id=484 bgcolor=#fefefe
| 515484 ||  || — || March 9, 1999 || Kitt Peak || Spacewatch || MAS || align=right data-sort-value="0.71" | 710 m || 
|-id=485 bgcolor=#fefefe
| 515485 ||  || — || November 15, 2001 || Kitt Peak || Spacewatch ||  || align=right data-sort-value="0.65" | 650 m || 
|-id=486 bgcolor=#fefefe
| 515486 ||  || — || January 9, 2010 || Mount Lemmon || Mount Lemmon Survey ||  || align=right | 1.6 km || 
|-id=487 bgcolor=#fefefe
| 515487 ||  || — || September 29, 2005 || Kitt Peak || Spacewatch || MAS || align=right data-sort-value="0.60" | 600 m || 
|-id=488 bgcolor=#fefefe
| 515488 ||  || — || October 18, 2008 || Kitt Peak || Spacewatch || NYS || align=right data-sort-value="0.70" | 700 m || 
|-id=489 bgcolor=#fefefe
| 515489 ||  || — || April 2, 2011 || Haleakala || Pan-STARRS ||  || align=right data-sort-value="0.77" | 770 m || 
|-id=490 bgcolor=#fefefe
| 515490 ||  || — || March 23, 2003 || Kitt Peak || Spacewatch || MAS || align=right data-sort-value="0.66" | 660 m || 
|-id=491 bgcolor=#fefefe
| 515491 ||  || — || November 25, 2005 || Mount Lemmon || Mount Lemmon Survey || NYS || align=right data-sort-value="0.52" | 520 m || 
|-id=492 bgcolor=#E9E9E9
| 515492 ||  || — || November 2, 2008 || Mount Lemmon || Mount Lemmon Survey ||  || align=right data-sort-value="0.85" | 850 m || 
|-id=493 bgcolor=#E9E9E9
| 515493 ||  || — || November 1, 2008 || Mount Lemmon || Mount Lemmon Survey ||  || align=right data-sort-value="0.82" | 820 m || 
|-id=494 bgcolor=#fefefe
| 515494 ||  || — || February 26, 2014 || Haleakala || Pan-STARRS ||  || align=right data-sort-value="0.86" | 860 m || 
|-id=495 bgcolor=#E9E9E9
| 515495 ||  || — || November 6, 1996 || Kitt Peak || Spacewatch ||  || align=right data-sort-value="0.78" | 780 m || 
|-id=496 bgcolor=#fefefe
| 515496 ||  || — || January 23, 2006 || Kitt Peak || Spacewatch ||  || align=right data-sort-value="0.72" | 720 m || 
|-id=497 bgcolor=#E9E9E9
| 515497 ||  || — || April 14, 2010 || Mount Lemmon || Mount Lemmon Survey ||  || align=right data-sort-value="0.71" | 710 m || 
|-id=498 bgcolor=#fefefe
| 515498 ||  || — || February 10, 2014 || Haleakala || Pan-STARRS ||  || align=right data-sort-value="0.63" | 630 m || 
|-id=499 bgcolor=#fefefe
| 515499 ||  || — || July 22, 2011 || Haleakala || Pan-STARRS || NYS || align=right data-sort-value="0.56" | 560 m || 
|-id=500 bgcolor=#E9E9E9
| 515500 ||  || — || September 2, 2011 || Haleakala || Pan-STARRS ||  || align=right data-sort-value="0.81" | 810 m || 
|}

515501–515600 

|-bgcolor=#E9E9E9
| 515501 ||  || — || September 10, 2007 || Mount Lemmon || Mount Lemmon Survey ||  || align=right data-sort-value="0.78" | 780 m || 
|-id=502 bgcolor=#fefefe
| 515502 ||  || — || January 3, 2014 || Mount Lemmon || Mount Lemmon Survey ||  || align=right data-sort-value="0.79" | 790 m || 
|-id=503 bgcolor=#E9E9E9
| 515503 ||  || — || September 24, 2008 || Kitt Peak || Spacewatch ||  || align=right data-sort-value="0.74" | 740 m || 
|-id=504 bgcolor=#E9E9E9
| 515504 ||  || — || March 16, 2010 || Mount Lemmon || Mount Lemmon Survey ||  || align=right | 2.3 km || 
|-id=505 bgcolor=#E9E9E9
| 515505 ||  || — || October 14, 2007 || Mount Lemmon || Mount Lemmon Survey ||  || align=right | 2.1 km || 
|-id=506 bgcolor=#E9E9E9
| 515506 ||  || — || August 10, 2007 || Kitt Peak || Spacewatch ||  || align=right data-sort-value="0.94" | 940 m || 
|-id=507 bgcolor=#E9E9E9
| 515507 ||  || — || March 13, 2010 || Mount Lemmon || Mount Lemmon Survey ||  || align=right data-sort-value="0.76" | 760 m || 
|-id=508 bgcolor=#fefefe
| 515508 ||  || — || March 5, 2014 || Haleakala || Pan-STARRS ||  || align=right | 2.2 km || 
|-id=509 bgcolor=#E9E9E9
| 515509 ||  || — || September 16, 2012 || Kitt Peak || Spacewatch ||  || align=right | 1.1 km || 
|-id=510 bgcolor=#fefefe
| 515510 ||  || — || November 12, 2012 || Haleakala || Pan-STARRS ||  || align=right data-sort-value="0.96" | 960 m || 
|-id=511 bgcolor=#E9E9E9
| 515511 ||  || — || March 23, 2006 || Kitt Peak || Spacewatch ||  || align=right data-sort-value="0.78" | 780 m || 
|-id=512 bgcolor=#E9E9E9
| 515512 ||  || — || May 2, 2006 || Kitt Peak || Spacewatch ||  || align=right | 1.3 km || 
|-id=513 bgcolor=#fefefe
| 515513 ||  || — || February 26, 2014 || Haleakala || Pan-STARRS ||  || align=right data-sort-value="0.81" | 810 m || 
|-id=514 bgcolor=#E9E9E9
| 515514 ||  || — || May 12, 2010 || Kitt Peak || Spacewatch ||  || align=right | 1.2 km || 
|-id=515 bgcolor=#E9E9E9
| 515515 ||  || — || February 18, 2010 || Mount Lemmon || Mount Lemmon Survey ||  || align=right data-sort-value="0.73" | 730 m || 
|-id=516 bgcolor=#E9E9E9
| 515516 ||  || — || February 26, 2014 || Mount Lemmon || Mount Lemmon Survey ||  || align=right | 1.3 km || 
|-id=517 bgcolor=#fefefe
| 515517 ||  || — || August 25, 2004 || Kitt Peak || Spacewatch ||  || align=right data-sort-value="0.88" | 880 m || 
|-id=518 bgcolor=#E9E9E9
| 515518 ||  || — || February 28, 2014 || Haleakala || Pan-STARRS ||  || align=right data-sort-value="0.66" | 660 m || 
|-id=519 bgcolor=#fefefe
| 515519 ||  || — || October 9, 2004 || Kitt Peak || Spacewatch ||  || align=right data-sort-value="0.94" | 940 m || 
|-id=520 bgcolor=#E9E9E9
| 515520 ||  || — || March 11, 2014 || Kitt Peak || Spacewatch ||  || align=right data-sort-value="0.98" | 980 m || 
|-id=521 bgcolor=#fefefe
| 515521 ||  || — || October 7, 2012 || Haleakala || Pan-STARRS ||  || align=right data-sort-value="0.87" | 870 m || 
|-id=522 bgcolor=#E9E9E9
| 515522 ||  || — || September 29, 2008 || Mount Lemmon || Mount Lemmon Survey ||  || align=right data-sort-value="0.86" | 860 m || 
|-id=523 bgcolor=#fefefe
| 515523 ||  || — || February 18, 2014 || Mount Lemmon || Mount Lemmon Survey ||  || align=right data-sort-value="0.98" | 980 m || 
|-id=524 bgcolor=#E9E9E9
| 515524 ||  || — || March 8, 2014 || Mount Lemmon || Mount Lemmon Survey ||  || align=right | 1.0 km || 
|-id=525 bgcolor=#E9E9E9
| 515525 ||  || — || March 17, 2010 || Kitt Peak || Spacewatch ||  || align=right data-sort-value="0.89" | 890 m || 
|-id=526 bgcolor=#E9E9E9
| 515526 ||  || — || July 4, 2010 || WISE || WISE ||  || align=right | 3.0 km || 
|-id=527 bgcolor=#E9E9E9
| 515527 ||  || — || December 8, 2012 || Mount Lemmon || Mount Lemmon Survey ||  || align=right | 1.3 km || 
|-id=528 bgcolor=#E9E9E9
| 515528 ||  || — || March 25, 2014 || Kitt Peak || Spacewatch ||  || align=right | 1.4 km || 
|-id=529 bgcolor=#E9E9E9
| 515529 ||  || — || October 11, 2007 || Mount Lemmon || Mount Lemmon Survey ||  || align=right | 1.9 km || 
|-id=530 bgcolor=#E9E9E9
| 515530 ||  || — || January 17, 2010 || WISE || WISE ||  || align=right | 2.6 km || 
|-id=531 bgcolor=#E9E9E9
| 515531 ||  || — || September 13, 2007 || Kitt Peak || Spacewatch ||  || align=right | 1.3 km || 
|-id=532 bgcolor=#E9E9E9
| 515532 ||  || — || April 1, 2014 || Mount Lemmon || Mount Lemmon Survey ||  || align=right data-sort-value="0.82" | 820 m || 
|-id=533 bgcolor=#E9E9E9
| 515533 ||  || — || August 30, 2011 || Haleakala || Pan-STARRS ||  || align=right data-sort-value="0.89" | 890 m || 
|-id=534 bgcolor=#E9E9E9
| 515534 ||  || — || September 13, 2007 || Kitt Peak || Spacewatch ||  || align=right | 1.3 km || 
|-id=535 bgcolor=#E9E9E9
| 515535 ||  || — || March 25, 2014 || Kitt Peak || Spacewatch ||  || align=right | 1.3 km || 
|-id=536 bgcolor=#E9E9E9
| 515536 ||  || — || March 8, 2005 || Mount Lemmon || Mount Lemmon Survey ||  || align=right | 1.4 km || 
|-id=537 bgcolor=#E9E9E9
| 515537 ||  || — || April 4, 2014 || Mount Lemmon || Mount Lemmon Survey ||  || align=right | 1.8 km || 
|-id=538 bgcolor=#E9E9E9
| 515538 ||  || — || May 4, 2006 || Kitt Peak || Spacewatch ||  || align=right data-sort-value="0.81" | 810 m || 
|-id=539 bgcolor=#E9E9E9
| 515539 ||  || — || April 21, 2006 || Kitt Peak || Spacewatch ||  || align=right data-sort-value="0.62" | 620 m || 
|-id=540 bgcolor=#E9E9E9
| 515540 ||  || — || November 19, 2008 || Kitt Peak || Spacewatch ||  || align=right data-sort-value="0.81" | 810 m || 
|-id=541 bgcolor=#E9E9E9
| 515541 ||  || — || May 4, 2005 || Mount Lemmon || Mount Lemmon Survey ||  || align=right | 1.8 km || 
|-id=542 bgcolor=#E9E9E9
| 515542 ||  || — || February 28, 2014 || Haleakala || Pan-STARRS ||  || align=right | 1.9 km || 
|-id=543 bgcolor=#E9E9E9
| 515543 ||  || — || May 1, 2006 || Kitt Peak || Spacewatch ||  || align=right data-sort-value="0.94" | 940 m || 
|-id=544 bgcolor=#E9E9E9
| 515544 ||  || — || April 5, 2014 || Haleakala || Pan-STARRS ||  || align=right | 1.2 km || 
|-id=545 bgcolor=#E9E9E9
| 515545 ||  || — || February 27, 2009 || Mount Lemmon || Mount Lemmon Survey ||  || align=right | 1.3 km || 
|-id=546 bgcolor=#E9E9E9
| 515546 ||  || — || October 19, 2007 || Mount Lemmon || Mount Lemmon Survey ||  || align=right | 1.4 km || 
|-id=547 bgcolor=#E9E9E9
| 515547 ||  || — || October 10, 2007 || Mount Lemmon || Mount Lemmon Survey ||  || align=right | 1.6 km || 
|-id=548 bgcolor=#E9E9E9
| 515548 ||  || — || September 23, 2011 || Haleakala || Pan-STARRS ||  || align=right | 1.2 km || 
|-id=549 bgcolor=#E9E9E9
| 515549 ||  || — || February 27, 2009 || Mount Lemmon || Mount Lemmon Survey ||  || align=right | 1.3 km || 
|-id=550 bgcolor=#E9E9E9
| 515550 ||  || — || April 10, 2005 || Mount Lemmon || Mount Lemmon Survey ||  || align=right | 2.1 km || 
|-id=551 bgcolor=#d6d6d6
| 515551 ||  || — || March 10, 2008 || Kitt Peak || Spacewatch ||  || align=right | 2.9 km || 
|-id=552 bgcolor=#E9E9E9
| 515552 ||  || — || October 19, 2011 || Mount Lemmon || Mount Lemmon Survey || BAR || align=right | 1.2 km || 
|-id=553 bgcolor=#E9E9E9
| 515553 ||  || — || April 20, 2014 || Kitt Peak || Spacewatch ||  || align=right | 1.5 km || 
|-id=554 bgcolor=#E9E9E9
| 515554 ||  || — || March 8, 2005 || Mount Lemmon || Mount Lemmon Survey ||  || align=right | 1.2 km || 
|-id=555 bgcolor=#E9E9E9
| 515555 ||  || — || April 21, 2014 || Mount Lemmon || Mount Lemmon Survey ||  || align=right | 1.9 km || 
|-id=556 bgcolor=#E9E9E9
| 515556 ||  || — || January 10, 2014 || Haleakala || Pan-STARRS ||  || align=right | 1.7 km || 
|-id=557 bgcolor=#E9E9E9
| 515557 ||  || — || July 6, 2010 || Mount Lemmon || Mount Lemmon Survey || EUN || align=right | 1.2 km || 
|-id=558 bgcolor=#E9E9E9
| 515558 ||  || — || December 30, 2008 || Kitt Peak || Spacewatch ||  || align=right | 1.3 km || 
|-id=559 bgcolor=#E9E9E9
| 515559 ||  || — || April 17, 2010 || WISE || WISE || ADE || align=right | 2.2 km || 
|-id=560 bgcolor=#E9E9E9
| 515560 ||  || — || May 28, 2010 || WISE || WISE ||  || align=right | 3.0 km || 
|-id=561 bgcolor=#E9E9E9
| 515561 ||  || — || March 24, 2014 || Haleakala || Pan-STARRS ||  || align=right | 1.3 km || 
|-id=562 bgcolor=#E9E9E9
| 515562 ||  || — || April 22, 2014 || Mount Lemmon || Mount Lemmon Survey ||  || align=right data-sort-value="0.98" | 980 m || 
|-id=563 bgcolor=#E9E9E9
| 515563 ||  || — || December 22, 2008 || Kitt Peak || Spacewatch ||  || align=right data-sort-value="0.94" | 940 m || 
|-id=564 bgcolor=#E9E9E9
| 515564 ||  || — || January 2, 2009 || Kitt Peak || Spacewatch ||  || align=right | 1.00 km || 
|-id=565 bgcolor=#E9E9E9
| 515565 ||  || — || September 28, 2006 || Kitt Peak || Spacewatch || AEO || align=right data-sort-value="0.99" | 990 m || 
|-id=566 bgcolor=#E9E9E9
| 515566 ||  || — || April 6, 2010 || Kitt Peak || Spacewatch ||  || align=right data-sort-value="0.87" | 870 m || 
|-id=567 bgcolor=#E9E9E9
| 515567 ||  || — || November 13, 2007 || Mount Lemmon || Mount Lemmon Survey ||  || align=right | 1.3 km || 
|-id=568 bgcolor=#E9E9E9
| 515568 ||  || — || October 8, 2007 || Mount Lemmon || Mount Lemmon Survey ||  || align=right | 1.6 km || 
|-id=569 bgcolor=#E9E9E9
| 515569 ||  || — || February 26, 2009 || Kitt Peak || Spacewatch ||  || align=right | 1.9 km || 
|-id=570 bgcolor=#E9E9E9
| 515570 ||  || — || March 25, 2014 || Kitt Peak || Spacewatch ||  || align=right data-sort-value="0.97" | 970 m || 
|-id=571 bgcolor=#E9E9E9
| 515571 ||  || — || January 16, 2013 || Haleakala || Pan-STARRS ||  || align=right | 1.7 km || 
|-id=572 bgcolor=#E9E9E9
| 515572 ||  || — || April 5, 2014 || Haleakala || Pan-STARRS ||  || align=right | 1.7 km || 
|-id=573 bgcolor=#E9E9E9
| 515573 ||  || — || March 28, 2014 || Mount Lemmon || Mount Lemmon Survey ||  || align=right | 1.3 km || 
|-id=574 bgcolor=#E9E9E9
| 515574 ||  || — || September 26, 2011 || Haleakala || Pan-STARRS || HOF || align=right | 2.0 km || 
|-id=575 bgcolor=#E9E9E9
| 515575 ||  || — || December 23, 2012 || Haleakala || Pan-STARRS ||  || align=right | 1.9 km || 
|-id=576 bgcolor=#E9E9E9
| 515576 ||  || — || August 24, 2011 || Haleakala || Pan-STARRS ||  || align=right | 1.0 km || 
|-id=577 bgcolor=#E9E9E9
| 515577 ||  || — || February 26, 2014 || Kitt Peak || Spacewatch ||  || align=right data-sort-value="0.78" | 780 m || 
|-id=578 bgcolor=#E9E9E9
| 515578 ||  || — || September 24, 2011 || Haleakala || Pan-STARRS ||  || align=right | 1.3 km || 
|-id=579 bgcolor=#E9E9E9
| 515579 ||  || — || November 17, 2008 || Kitt Peak || Spacewatch ||  || align=right data-sort-value="0.87" | 870 m || 
|-id=580 bgcolor=#E9E9E9
| 515580 ||  || — || March 13, 2005 || Mount Lemmon || Mount Lemmon Survey ||  || align=right | 1.3 km || 
|-id=581 bgcolor=#E9E9E9
| 515581 ||  || — || April 20, 2014 || Mount Lemmon || Mount Lemmon Survey ||  || align=right | 1.5 km || 
|-id=582 bgcolor=#E9E9E9
| 515582 ||  || — || October 12, 2007 || Mount Lemmon || Mount Lemmon Survey ||  || align=right data-sort-value="0.94" | 940 m || 
|-id=583 bgcolor=#E9E9E9
| 515583 ||  || — || October 25, 2011 || Haleakala || Pan-STARRS ||  || align=right | 1.9 km || 
|-id=584 bgcolor=#E9E9E9
| 515584 ||  || — || May 3, 2014 || Mount Lemmon || Mount Lemmon Survey ||  || align=right | 1.6 km || 
|-id=585 bgcolor=#E9E9E9
| 515585 ||  || — || February 28, 2014 || Haleakala || Pan-STARRS ||  || align=right | 1.5 km || 
|-id=586 bgcolor=#E9E9E9
| 515586 ||  || — || December 16, 2007 || Kitt Peak || Spacewatch ||  || align=right | 1.8 km || 
|-id=587 bgcolor=#E9E9E9
| 515587 ||  || — || April 21, 2014 || Kitt Peak || Spacewatch ||  || align=right | 1.9 km || 
|-id=588 bgcolor=#E9E9E9
| 515588 ||  || — || May 3, 2014 || Mount Lemmon || Mount Lemmon Survey ||  || align=right data-sort-value="0.97" | 970 m || 
|-id=589 bgcolor=#E9E9E9
| 515589 ||  || — || February 28, 2014 || Haleakala || Pan-STARRS ||  || align=right | 1.3 km || 
|-id=590 bgcolor=#E9E9E9
| 515590 ||  || — || June 2, 2005 || Mount Lemmon || Mount Lemmon Survey ||  || align=right | 1.9 km || 
|-id=591 bgcolor=#E9E9E9
| 515591 ||  || — || February 28, 2014 || Haleakala || Pan-STARRS ||  || align=right | 1.6 km || 
|-id=592 bgcolor=#E9E9E9
| 515592 ||  || — || April 4, 2014 || Haleakala || Pan-STARRS ||  || align=right | 1.7 km || 
|-id=593 bgcolor=#E9E9E9
| 515593 ||  || — || April 5, 2014 || Haleakala || Pan-STARRS ||  || align=right | 1.7 km || 
|-id=594 bgcolor=#E9E9E9
| 515594 ||  || — || March 28, 2014 || Mount Lemmon || Mount Lemmon Survey ||  || align=right | 2.1 km || 
|-id=595 bgcolor=#E9E9E9
| 515595 ||  || — || September 23, 2011 || Haleakala || Pan-STARRS ||  || align=right | 2.1 km || 
|-id=596 bgcolor=#E9E9E9
| 515596 ||  || — || April 30, 2014 || Haleakala || Pan-STARRS ||  || align=right | 2.4 km || 
|-id=597 bgcolor=#E9E9E9
| 515597 ||  || — || February 22, 2009 || Kitt Peak || Spacewatch ||  || align=right | 1.7 km || 
|-id=598 bgcolor=#E9E9E9
| 515598 ||  || — || November 14, 2007 || Kitt Peak || Spacewatch ||  || align=right | 1.3 km || 
|-id=599 bgcolor=#E9E9E9
| 515599 ||  || — || March 28, 2010 || WISE || WISE || ADE || align=right | 1.8 km || 
|-id=600 bgcolor=#E9E9E9
| 515600 ||  || — || April 29, 2010 || WISE || WISE ||  || align=right | 1.8 km || 
|}

515601–515700 

|-bgcolor=#E9E9E9
| 515601 ||  || — || December 5, 2008 || Mount Lemmon || Mount Lemmon Survey ||  || align=right | 1.0 km || 
|-id=602 bgcolor=#E9E9E9
| 515602 ||  || — || January 10, 2013 || Haleakala || Pan-STARRS ||  || align=right | 1.9 km || 
|-id=603 bgcolor=#E9E9E9
| 515603 ||  || — || February 22, 2001 || Kitt Peak || Spacewatch ||  || align=right data-sort-value="0.89" | 890 m || 
|-id=604 bgcolor=#E9E9E9
| 515604 ||  || — || May 8, 2005 || Mount Lemmon || Mount Lemmon Survey ||  || align=right | 1.8 km || 
|-id=605 bgcolor=#E9E9E9
| 515605 ||  || — || December 6, 2012 || Mount Lemmon || Mount Lemmon Survey ||  || align=right | 1.5 km || 
|-id=606 bgcolor=#E9E9E9
| 515606 ||  || — || March 17, 2005 || Mount Lemmon || Mount Lemmon Survey ||  || align=right data-sort-value="0.91" | 910 m || 
|-id=607 bgcolor=#E9E9E9
| 515607 ||  || — || October 12, 2007 || Mount Lemmon || Mount Lemmon Survey ||  || align=right | 1.4 km || 
|-id=608 bgcolor=#E9E9E9
| 515608 ||  || — || November 8, 2007 || Mount Lemmon || Mount Lemmon Survey ||  || align=right | 1.4 km || 
|-id=609 bgcolor=#E9E9E9
| 515609 ||  || — || June 17, 2010 || Mount Lemmon || Mount Lemmon Survey ||  || align=right | 1.5 km || 
|-id=610 bgcolor=#E9E9E9
| 515610 ||  || — || May 4, 2014 || Mount Lemmon || Mount Lemmon Survey ||  || align=right | 1.2 km || 
|-id=611 bgcolor=#d6d6d6
| 515611 ||  || — || May 8, 2014 || Haleakala || Pan-STARRS ||  || align=right | 1.9 km || 
|-id=612 bgcolor=#E9E9E9
| 515612 ||  || — || May 5, 2014 || Haleakala || Pan-STARRS ||  || align=right | 1.7 km || 
|-id=613 bgcolor=#E9E9E9
| 515613 ||  || — || April 7, 2005 || Kitt Peak || Spacewatch ||  || align=right | 1.2 km || 
|-id=614 bgcolor=#FA8072
| 515614 ||  || — || September 27, 2006 || Catalina || CSS ||  || align=right | 1.8 km || 
|-id=615 bgcolor=#E9E9E9
| 515615 ||  || — || December 30, 2008 || Kitt Peak || Spacewatch ||  || align=right | 1.5 km || 
|-id=616 bgcolor=#E9E9E9
| 515616 ||  || — || January 30, 2004 || Kitt Peak || Spacewatch ||  || align=right | 2.0 km || 
|-id=617 bgcolor=#E9E9E9
| 515617 ||  || — || January 6, 2013 || Mount Lemmon || Mount Lemmon Survey ||  || align=right | 2.0 km || 
|-id=618 bgcolor=#E9E9E9
| 515618 ||  || — || February 4, 2005 || Kitt Peak || Spacewatch ||  || align=right | 1.1 km || 
|-id=619 bgcolor=#E9E9E9
| 515619 ||  || — || May 7, 2014 || Haleakala || Pan-STARRS ||  || align=right | 2.1 km || 
|-id=620 bgcolor=#d6d6d6
| 515620 ||  || — || May 28, 2014 || Haleakala || Pan-STARRS ||  || align=right | 2.9 km || 
|-id=621 bgcolor=#E9E9E9
| 515621 ||  || — || April 30, 2010 || WISE || WISE ||  || align=right | 2.1 km || 
|-id=622 bgcolor=#E9E9E9
| 515622 ||  || — || July 14, 2010 || WISE || WISE ||  || align=right | 2.6 km || 
|-id=623 bgcolor=#E9E9E9
| 515623 ||  || — || April 12, 2005 || Kitt Peak || Spacewatch ||  || align=right | 1.3 km || 
|-id=624 bgcolor=#E9E9E9
| 515624 ||  || — || February 26, 2009 || Catalina || CSS ||  || align=right | 1.4 km || 
|-id=625 bgcolor=#E9E9E9
| 515625 ||  || — || December 4, 2007 || Mount Lemmon || Mount Lemmon Survey ||  || align=right | 1.3 km || 
|-id=626 bgcolor=#E9E9E9
| 515626 ||  || — || October 21, 2007 || Mount Lemmon || Mount Lemmon Survey || EUN || align=right | 1.3 km || 
|-id=627 bgcolor=#E9E9E9
| 515627 ||  || — || February 9, 2013 || Haleakala || Pan-STARRS ||  || align=right | 2.0 km || 
|-id=628 bgcolor=#E9E9E9
| 515628 ||  || — || October 20, 2011 || Mount Lemmon || Mount Lemmon Survey ||  || align=right | 2.0 km || 
|-id=629 bgcolor=#E9E9E9
| 515629 ||  || — || October 24, 2011 || Haleakala || Pan-STARRS ||  || align=right | 1.4 km || 
|-id=630 bgcolor=#E9E9E9
| 515630 ||  || — || March 2, 2009 || Mount Lemmon || Mount Lemmon Survey ||  || align=right | 1.8 km || 
|-id=631 bgcolor=#E9E9E9
| 515631 ||  || — || February 14, 2005 || Kitt Peak || Spacewatch ||  || align=right | 1.2 km || 
|-id=632 bgcolor=#d6d6d6
| 515632 ||  || — || February 3, 2012 || Haleakala || Pan-STARRS ||  || align=right | 2.9 km || 
|-id=633 bgcolor=#d6d6d6
| 515633 ||  || — || October 30, 2010 || Kitt Peak || Spacewatch ||  || align=right | 3.0 km || 
|-id=634 bgcolor=#d6d6d6
| 515634 ||  || — || December 1, 2011 || Haleakala || Pan-STARRS ||  || align=right | 2.5 km || 
|-id=635 bgcolor=#E9E9E9
| 515635 ||  || — || April 28, 2014 || Haleakala || Pan-STARRS ||  || align=right | 1.4 km || 
|-id=636 bgcolor=#E9E9E9
| 515636 ||  || — || June 21, 2014 || Mount Lemmon || Mount Lemmon Survey ||  || align=right | 1.0 km || 
|-id=637 bgcolor=#E9E9E9
| 515637 ||  || — || January 17, 2013 || Haleakala || Pan-STARRS ||  || align=right | 1.8 km || 
|-id=638 bgcolor=#E9E9E9
| 515638 ||  || — || November 23, 2011 || Mount Lemmon || Mount Lemmon Survey ||  || align=right | 2.1 km || 
|-id=639 bgcolor=#FFC2E0
| 515639 ||  || — || June 27, 2014 || Haleakala || Pan-STARRS || APO || align=right data-sort-value="0.18" | 180 m || 
|-id=640 bgcolor=#d6d6d6
| 515640 ||  || — || August 12, 2010 || Kitt Peak || Spacewatch ||  || align=right | 2.5 km || 
|-id=641 bgcolor=#E9E9E9
| 515641 ||  || — || June 18, 2014 || Haleakala || Pan-STARRS ||  || align=right | 3.5 km || 
|-id=642 bgcolor=#d6d6d6
| 515642 ||  || — || June 27, 2014 || Haleakala || Pan-STARRS ||  || align=right | 2.6 km || 
|-id=643 bgcolor=#d6d6d6
| 515643 ||  || — || October 30, 2005 || Kitt Peak || Spacewatch ||  || align=right | 2.2 km || 
|-id=644 bgcolor=#d6d6d6
| 515644 ||  || — || March 9, 2007 || Mount Lemmon || Mount Lemmon Survey ||  || align=right | 2.5 km || 
|-id=645 bgcolor=#d6d6d6
| 515645 ||  || — || July 2, 2014 || Haleakala || Pan-STARRS ||  || align=right | 2.5 km || 
|-id=646 bgcolor=#d6d6d6
| 515646 ||  || — || September 29, 2009 || Mount Lemmon || Mount Lemmon Survey ||  || align=right | 2.7 km || 
|-id=647 bgcolor=#d6d6d6
| 515647 ||  || — || January 19, 2012 || Haleakala || Pan-STARRS ||  || align=right | 2.5 km || 
|-id=648 bgcolor=#d6d6d6
| 515648 ||  || — || December 25, 2005 || Kitt Peak || Spacewatch ||  || align=right | 2.4 km || 
|-id=649 bgcolor=#d6d6d6
| 515649 ||  || — || October 25, 2005 || Kitt Peak || Spacewatch || KOR || align=right | 1.3 km || 
|-id=650 bgcolor=#d6d6d6
| 515650 ||  || — || May 3, 2008 || Mount Lemmon || Mount Lemmon Survey ||  || align=right | 2.1 km || 
|-id=651 bgcolor=#d6d6d6
| 515651 ||  || — || March 4, 2008 || Mount Lemmon || Mount Lemmon Survey ||  || align=right | 2.2 km || 
|-id=652 bgcolor=#d6d6d6
| 515652 ||  || — || February 4, 2012 || Haleakala || Pan-STARRS ||  || align=right | 2.9 km || 
|-id=653 bgcolor=#d6d6d6
| 515653 ||  || — || June 27, 2014 || Haleakala || Pan-STARRS ||  || align=right | 2.7 km || 
|-id=654 bgcolor=#d6d6d6
| 515654 ||  || — || July 26, 2014 || Haleakala || Pan-STARRS ||  || align=right | 2.6 km || 
|-id=655 bgcolor=#d6d6d6
| 515655 ||  || — || December 1, 2005 || Mount Lemmon || Mount Lemmon Survey || VER || align=right | 2.5 km || 
|-id=656 bgcolor=#d6d6d6
| 515656 ||  || — || November 12, 2010 || Mount Lemmon || Mount Lemmon Survey ||  || align=right | 2.2 km || 
|-id=657 bgcolor=#E9E9E9
| 515657 ||  || — || January 10, 2013 || Haleakala || Pan-STARRS || EUN || align=right | 1.1 km || 
|-id=658 bgcolor=#E9E9E9
| 515658 ||  || — || October 25, 2011 || Haleakala || Pan-STARRS || MAR || align=right | 1.1 km || 
|-id=659 bgcolor=#d6d6d6
| 515659 ||  || — || February 3, 2012 || Mount Lemmon || Mount Lemmon Survey ||  || align=right | 3.2 km || 
|-id=660 bgcolor=#d6d6d6
| 515660 ||  || — || February 21, 2007 || Mount Lemmon || Mount Lemmon Survey ||  || align=right | 2.8 km || 
|-id=661 bgcolor=#d6d6d6
| 515661 ||  || — || September 16, 1998 || Anderson Mesa || LONEOS ||  || align=right | 3.2 km || 
|-id=662 bgcolor=#d6d6d6
| 515662 ||  || — || January 19, 2012 || Kitt Peak || Spacewatch ||  || align=right | 2.7 km || 
|-id=663 bgcolor=#d6d6d6
| 515663 ||  || — || April 11, 2013 || Mount Lemmon || Mount Lemmon Survey ||  || align=right | 2.9 km || 
|-id=664 bgcolor=#d6d6d6
| 515664 ||  || — || September 7, 2004 || Kitt Peak || Spacewatch ||  || align=right | 2.5 km || 
|-id=665 bgcolor=#d6d6d6
| 515665 ||  || — || August 17, 2009 || Kitt Peak || Spacewatch ||  || align=right | 2.8 km || 
|-id=666 bgcolor=#d6d6d6
| 515666 ||  || — || April 19, 2013 || Haleakala || Pan-STARRS ||  || align=right | 2.9 km || 
|-id=667 bgcolor=#d6d6d6
| 515667 ||  || — || June 26, 2014 || Haleakala || Pan-STARRS ||  || align=right | 3.7 km || 
|-id=668 bgcolor=#d6d6d6
| 515668 ||  || — || December 3, 2010 || Mount Lemmon || Mount Lemmon Survey ||  || align=right | 2.4 km || 
|-id=669 bgcolor=#d6d6d6
| 515669 ||  || — || January 31, 2006 || Mount Lemmon || Mount Lemmon Survey ||  || align=right | 3.1 km || 
|-id=670 bgcolor=#d6d6d6
| 515670 ||  || — || July 29, 2014 || Haleakala || Pan-STARRS ||  || align=right | 2.3 km || 
|-id=671 bgcolor=#d6d6d6
| 515671 ||  || — || May 27, 2014 || Mount Lemmon || Mount Lemmon Survey ||  || align=right | 2.2 km || 
|-id=672 bgcolor=#d6d6d6
| 515672 ||  || — || November 14, 2010 || Kitt Peak || Spacewatch ||  || align=right | 2.3 km || 
|-id=673 bgcolor=#d6d6d6
| 515673 ||  || — || April 6, 2013 || Mount Lemmon || Mount Lemmon Survey ||  || align=right | 2.0 km || 
|-id=674 bgcolor=#d6d6d6
| 515674 ||  || — || April 10, 2013 || Haleakala || Pan-STARRS ||  || align=right | 2.0 km || 
|-id=675 bgcolor=#d6d6d6
| 515675 ||  || — || June 28, 2014 || Haleakala || Pan-STARRS ||  || align=right | 3.1 km || 
|-id=676 bgcolor=#d6d6d6
| 515676 ||  || — || May 2, 2008 || Kitt Peak || Spacewatch ||  || align=right | 2.3 km || 
|-id=677 bgcolor=#d6d6d6
| 515677 ||  || — || February 13, 2012 || Haleakala || Pan-STARRS ||  || align=right | 2.9 km || 
|-id=678 bgcolor=#d6d6d6
| 515678 ||  || — || May 11, 2008 || Kitt Peak || Spacewatch ||  || align=right | 2.1 km || 
|-id=679 bgcolor=#d6d6d6
| 515679 ||  || — || January 18, 2012 || Mount Lemmon || Mount Lemmon Survey ||  || align=right | 2.3 km || 
|-id=680 bgcolor=#d6d6d6
| 515680 ||  || — || March 14, 2013 || Kitt Peak || Spacewatch ||  || align=right | 2.1 km || 
|-id=681 bgcolor=#d6d6d6
| 515681 ||  || — || July 25, 2014 || Haleakala || Pan-STARRS ||  || align=right | 2.1 km || 
|-id=682 bgcolor=#d6d6d6
| 515682 ||  || — || March 16, 2013 || Kitt Peak || Spacewatch ||  || align=right | 2.8 km || 
|-id=683 bgcolor=#d6d6d6
| 515683 ||  || — || January 30, 2011 || Mount Lemmon || Mount Lemmon Survey || 7:4 || align=right | 2.9 km || 
|-id=684 bgcolor=#d6d6d6
| 515684 ||  || — || February 1, 2012 || Mount Lemmon || Mount Lemmon Survey ||  || align=right | 2.7 km || 
|-id=685 bgcolor=#d6d6d6
| 515685 ||  || — || January 2, 2009 || Kitt Peak || Spacewatch || 3:2 || align=right | 3.4 km || 
|-id=686 bgcolor=#d6d6d6
| 515686 ||  || — || April 13, 2013 || Haleakala || Pan-STARRS ||  || align=right | 2.2 km || 
|-id=687 bgcolor=#E9E9E9
| 515687 ||  || — || May 6, 2014 || Haleakala || Pan-STARRS ||  || align=right | 2.2 km || 
|-id=688 bgcolor=#fefefe
| 515688 ||  || — || September 11, 2007 || Kitt Peak || Spacewatch ||  || align=right | 1.0 km || 
|-id=689 bgcolor=#d6d6d6
| 515689 ||  || — || September 17, 2009 || Catalina || CSS ||  || align=right | 2.4 km || 
|-id=690 bgcolor=#d6d6d6
| 515690 ||  || — || January 22, 2006 || Mount Lemmon || Mount Lemmon Survey ||  || align=right | 2.6 km || 
|-id=691 bgcolor=#d6d6d6
| 515691 ||  || — || May 26, 2014 || Mount Lemmon || Mount Lemmon Survey || Tj (2.99) || align=right | 3.3 km || 
|-id=692 bgcolor=#d6d6d6
| 515692 ||  || — || November 25, 2005 || Mount Lemmon || Mount Lemmon Survey ||  || align=right | 2.7 km || 
|-id=693 bgcolor=#d6d6d6
| 515693 ||  || — || September 17, 2009 || Mount Lemmon || Mount Lemmon Survey || HYG || align=right | 2.4 km || 
|-id=694 bgcolor=#d6d6d6
| 515694 ||  || — || March 3, 2013 || Kitt Peak || Spacewatch ||  || align=right | 2.4 km || 
|-id=695 bgcolor=#d6d6d6
| 515695 ||  || — || January 19, 2012 || Haleakala || Pan-STARRS ||  || align=right | 2.5 km || 
|-id=696 bgcolor=#d6d6d6
| 515696 ||  || — || June 3, 2014 || Haleakala || Pan-STARRS ||  || align=right | 2.7 km || 
|-id=697 bgcolor=#d6d6d6
| 515697 ||  || — || May 8, 2013 || Haleakala || Pan-STARRS ||  || align=right | 2.1 km || 
|-id=698 bgcolor=#d6d6d6
| 515698 ||  || — || January 19, 2012 || Kitt Peak || Spacewatch ||  || align=right | 2.8 km || 
|-id=699 bgcolor=#d6d6d6
| 515699 ||  || — || October 17, 2009 || Mount Lemmon || Mount Lemmon Survey ||  || align=right | 2.1 km || 
|-id=700 bgcolor=#d6d6d6
| 515700 ||  || — || April 18, 2007 || Mount Lemmon || Mount Lemmon Survey ||  || align=right | 2.9 km || 
|}

515701–515800 

|-bgcolor=#d6d6d6
| 515701 ||  || — || March 14, 2012 || Catalina || CSS ||  || align=right | 3.1 km || 
|-id=702 bgcolor=#d6d6d6
| 515702 ||  || — || January 19, 2012 || Haleakala || Pan-STARRS ||  || align=right | 2.5 km || 
|-id=703 bgcolor=#d6d6d6
| 515703 ||  || — || February 23, 2007 || Mount Lemmon || Mount Lemmon Survey ||  || align=right | 2.3 km || 
|-id=704 bgcolor=#d6d6d6
| 515704 ||  || — || February 3, 2010 || WISE || WISE ||  || align=right | 5.0 km || 
|-id=705 bgcolor=#d6d6d6
| 515705 ||  || — || August 27, 2014 || Haleakala || Pan-STARRS || VER || align=right | 2.2 km || 
|-id=706 bgcolor=#d6d6d6
| 515706 ||  || — || September 19, 2003 || Kitt Peak || Spacewatch ||  || align=right | 3.4 km || 
|-id=707 bgcolor=#d6d6d6
| 515707 ||  || — || February 8, 2007 || Mount Lemmon || Mount Lemmon Survey ||  || align=right | 3.1 km || 
|-id=708 bgcolor=#d6d6d6
| 515708 ||  || — || January 23, 2006 || Kitt Peak || Spacewatch ||  || align=right | 3.2 km || 
|-id=709 bgcolor=#d6d6d6
| 515709 ||  || — || March 14, 2007 || Mount Lemmon || Mount Lemmon Survey ||  || align=right | 2.4 km || 
|-id=710 bgcolor=#d6d6d6
| 515710 ||  || — || March 14, 2007 || Mount Lemmon || Mount Lemmon Survey ||  || align=right | 2.8 km || 
|-id=711 bgcolor=#d6d6d6
| 515711 ||  || — || February 23, 2012 || Mount Lemmon || Mount Lemmon Survey ||  || align=right | 2.4 km || 
|-id=712 bgcolor=#d6d6d6
| 515712 ||  || — || June 28, 2014 || Mount Lemmon || Mount Lemmon Survey ||  || align=right | 2.9 km || 
|-id=713 bgcolor=#d6d6d6
| 515713 ||  || — || August 1, 2009 || Siding Spring || SSS ||  || align=right | 2.7 km || 
|-id=714 bgcolor=#d6d6d6
| 515714 ||  || — || March 26, 2006 || Mount Lemmon || Mount Lemmon Survey ||  || align=right | 3.0 km || 
|-id=715 bgcolor=#d6d6d6
| 515715 ||  || — || March 14, 2007 || Mount Lemmon || Mount Lemmon Survey ||  || align=right | 4.0 km || 
|-id=716 bgcolor=#d6d6d6
| 515716 ||  || — || October 16, 2003 || Kitt Peak || Spacewatch ||  || align=right | 3.7 km || 
|-id=717 bgcolor=#C2FFFF
| 515717 ||  || — || September 14, 2013 || Haleakala || Pan-STARRS || L5 || align=right | 7.7 km || 
|-id=718 bgcolor=#C2FFFF
| 515718 ||  || — || March 28, 2008 || Kitt Peak || Spacewatch || n.a. || align=right | 8.0 km || 
|-id=719 bgcolor=#fefefe
| 515719 ||  || — || April 29, 2003 || Socorro || LINEAR || H || align=right data-sort-value="0.65" | 650 m || 
|-id=720 bgcolor=#fefefe
| 515720 ||  || — || August 31, 2014 || Haleakala || Pan-STARRS || H || align=right data-sort-value="0.58" | 580 m || 
|-id=721 bgcolor=#C2FFFF
| 515721 ||  || — || October 1, 2013 || Mount Lemmon || Mount Lemmon Survey || L5 || align=right | 7.3 km || 
|-id=722 bgcolor=#d6d6d6
| 515722 ||  || — || December 8, 2005 || Kitt Peak || Spacewatch ||  || align=right | 4.0 km || 
|-id=723 bgcolor=#d6d6d6
| 515723 ||  || — || March 15, 2007 || Mount Lemmon || Mount Lemmon Survey ||  || align=right | 3.5 km || 
|-id=724 bgcolor=#fefefe
| 515724 ||  || — || September 28, 2006 || Kitt Peak || Spacewatch || H || align=right data-sort-value="0.49" | 490 m || 
|-id=725 bgcolor=#fefefe
| 515725 ||  || — || September 24, 2011 || Catalina || CSS || H || align=right data-sort-value="0.94" | 940 m || 
|-id=726 bgcolor=#C2FFFF
| 515726 ||  || — || September 4, 2014 || Haleakala || Pan-STARRS || L5 || align=right | 8.7 km || 
|-id=727 bgcolor=#C2FFFF
| 515727 ||  || — || April 14, 2008 || Kitt Peak || Spacewatch || L5 || align=right | 8.2 km || 
|-id=728 bgcolor=#C2FFFF
| 515728 ||  || — || March 10, 2008 || Mount Lemmon || Mount Lemmon Survey || L5 || align=right | 10 km || 
|-id=729 bgcolor=#E9E9E9
| 515729 ||  || — || June 9, 2004 || Kitt Peak || Spacewatch ||  || align=right | 2.4 km || 
|-id=730 bgcolor=#C2FFFF
| 515730 ||  || — || May 15, 2008 || Mount Lemmon || Mount Lemmon Survey || L5 || align=right | 7.3 km || 
|-id=731 bgcolor=#fefefe
| 515731 ||  || — || December 27, 2011 || Mount Lemmon || Mount Lemmon Survey || H || align=right data-sort-value="0.77" | 770 m || 
|-id=732 bgcolor=#fefefe
| 515732 ||  || — || December 13, 2014 || Haleakala || Pan-STARRS || H || align=right data-sort-value="0.72" | 720 m || 
|-id=733 bgcolor=#fefefe
| 515733 ||  || — || December 30, 2014 || Haleakala || Pan-STARRS || H || align=right data-sort-value="0.59" | 590 m || 
|-id=734 bgcolor=#fefefe
| 515734 ||  || — || October 2, 2008 || Mount Lemmon || Mount Lemmon Survey || H || align=right data-sort-value="0.86" | 860 m || 
|-id=735 bgcolor=#fefefe
| 515735 ||  || — || February 17, 2007 || Kitt Peak || Spacewatch || H || align=right data-sort-value="0.54" | 540 m || 
|-id=736 bgcolor=#fefefe
| 515736 ||  || — || July 11, 2005 || Kitt Peak || Spacewatch || H || align=right data-sort-value="0.57" | 570 m || 
|-id=737 bgcolor=#fefefe
| 515737 ||  || — || March 14, 2007 || Kitt Peak || Spacewatch || H || align=right data-sort-value="0.62" | 620 m || 
|-id=738 bgcolor=#C2FFFF
| 515738 ||  || — || March 15, 2007 || Mount Lemmon || Mount Lemmon Survey || L5 || align=right | 8.7 km || 
|-id=739 bgcolor=#d6d6d6
| 515739 ||  || — || March 15, 2005 || Mount Lemmon || Mount Lemmon Survey ||  || align=right | 2.6 km || 
|-id=740 bgcolor=#fefefe
| 515740 ||  || — || December 8, 2010 || Mount Lemmon || Mount Lemmon Survey ||  || align=right data-sort-value="0.77" | 770 m || 
|-id=741 bgcolor=#fefefe
| 515741 ||  || — || July 2, 2005 || Kitt Peak || Spacewatch || H || align=right data-sort-value="0.75" | 750 m || 
|-id=742 bgcolor=#FFC2E0
| 515742 ||  || — || February 8, 2015 || Haleakala || Pan-STARRS || ATE || align=right data-sort-value="0.25" | 250 m || 
|-id=743 bgcolor=#fefefe
| 515743 ||  || — || January 18, 2012 || Catalina || CSS ||  || align=right data-sort-value="0.54" | 540 m || 
|-id=744 bgcolor=#fefefe
| 515744 ||  || — || March 20, 1998 || Socorro || LINEAR ||  || align=right data-sort-value="0.83" | 830 m || 
|-id=745 bgcolor=#fefefe
| 515745 ||  || — || October 27, 2006 || Mount Lemmon || Mount Lemmon Survey ||  || align=right data-sort-value="0.73" | 730 m || 
|-id=746 bgcolor=#fefefe
| 515746 ||  || — || February 21, 2012 || Kitt Peak || Spacewatch ||  || align=right data-sort-value="0.71" | 710 m || 
|-id=747 bgcolor=#E9E9E9
| 515747 ||  || — || March 18, 2002 || Kitt Peak || Spacewatch ||  || align=right | 2.3 km || 
|-id=748 bgcolor=#fefefe
| 515748 ||  || — || January 19, 2015 || Haleakala || Pan-STARRS || H || align=right data-sort-value="0.65" | 650 m || 
|-id=749 bgcolor=#fefefe
| 515749 ||  || — || November 9, 2013 || Mount Lemmon || Mount Lemmon Survey ||  || align=right data-sort-value="0.59" | 590 m || 
|-id=750 bgcolor=#E9E9E9
| 515750 ||  || — || November 17, 2008 || Kitt Peak || Spacewatch ||  || align=right | 1.6 km || 
|-id=751 bgcolor=#fefefe
| 515751 ||  || — || December 18, 2007 || Mount Lemmon || Mount Lemmon Survey ||  || align=right data-sort-value="0.60" | 600 m || 
|-id=752 bgcolor=#fefefe
| 515752 ||  || — || January 21, 2015 || Haleakala || Pan-STARRS ||  || align=right data-sort-value="0.51" | 510 m || 
|-id=753 bgcolor=#fefefe
| 515753 ||  || — || September 27, 2006 || Mount Lemmon || Mount Lemmon Survey ||  || align=right data-sort-value="0.76" | 760 m || 
|-id=754 bgcolor=#fefefe
| 515754 ||  || — || April 21, 1998 || Kitt Peak || Spacewatch ||  || align=right data-sort-value="0.68" | 680 m || 
|-id=755 bgcolor=#fefefe
| 515755 ||  || — || February 10, 2015 || Catalina || CSS || H || align=right data-sort-value="0.94" | 940 m || 
|-id=756 bgcolor=#fefefe
| 515756 ||  || — || September 21, 2012 || Catalina || CSS || V || align=right data-sort-value="0.68" | 680 m || 
|-id=757 bgcolor=#d6d6d6
| 515757 ||  || — || January 31, 2009 || Mount Lemmon || Mount Lemmon Survey ||  || align=right | 2.7 km || 
|-id=758 bgcolor=#fefefe
| 515758 ||  || — || February 23, 2015 || Haleakala || Pan-STARRS ||  || align=right data-sort-value="0.89" | 890 m || 
|-id=759 bgcolor=#fefefe
| 515759 ||  || — || September 12, 2013 || Mount Lemmon || Mount Lemmon Survey ||  || align=right data-sort-value="0.78" | 780 m || 
|-id=760 bgcolor=#fefefe
| 515760 ||  || — || June 6, 2013 || Mount Lemmon || Mount Lemmon Survey || H || align=right data-sort-value="0.87" | 870 m || 
|-id=761 bgcolor=#fefefe
| 515761 ||  || — || February 11, 2008 || Kitt Peak || Spacewatch ||  || align=right data-sort-value="0.56" | 560 m || 
|-id=762 bgcolor=#fefefe
| 515762 ||  || — || November 10, 2013 || Kitt Peak || Spacewatch ||  || align=right data-sort-value="0.71" | 710 m || 
|-id=763 bgcolor=#fefefe
| 515763 ||  || — || March 21, 2015 || Haleakala || Pan-STARRS ||  || align=right data-sort-value="0.79" | 790 m || 
|-id=764 bgcolor=#fefefe
| 515764 ||  || — || October 5, 2003 || Kitt Peak || Spacewatch ||  || align=right data-sort-value="0.67" | 670 m || 
|-id=765 bgcolor=#fefefe
| 515765 ||  || — || July 28, 2008 || La Sagra || OAM Obs. ||  || align=right data-sort-value="0.78" | 780 m || 
|-id=766 bgcolor=#fefefe
| 515766 ||  || — || October 2, 2006 || Mount Lemmon || Mount Lemmon Survey ||  || align=right data-sort-value="0.58" | 580 m || 
|-id=767 bgcolor=#FFC2E0
| 515767 ||  || — || May 13, 2015 || Haleakala || Pan-STARRS 2 || APOPHAcritical || align=right data-sort-value="0.21" | 210 m || 
|-id=768 bgcolor=#fefefe
| 515768 ||  || — || August 30, 2005 || Kitt Peak || Spacewatch ||  || align=right data-sort-value="0.82" | 820 m || 
|-id=769 bgcolor=#E9E9E9
| 515769 ||  || — || June 10, 2011 || Mount Lemmon || Mount Lemmon Survey || fast? || align=right | 1.1 km || 
|-id=770 bgcolor=#fefefe
| 515770 ||  || — || April 11, 2008 || Mount Lemmon || Mount Lemmon Survey ||  || align=right data-sort-value="0.73" | 730 m || 
|-id=771 bgcolor=#fefefe
| 515771 ||  || — || June 14, 2012 || Haleakala || Pan-STARRS ||  || align=right data-sort-value="0.67" | 670 m || 
|-id=772 bgcolor=#fefefe
| 515772 ||  || — || November 14, 2012 || Kitt Peak || Spacewatch ||  || align=right data-sort-value="0.71" | 710 m || 
|-id=773 bgcolor=#fefefe
| 515773 ||  || — || August 26, 2012 || Catalina || CSS ||  || align=right data-sort-value="0.65" | 650 m || 
|-id=774 bgcolor=#d6d6d6
| 515774 ||  || — || April 2, 2009 || Kitt Peak || Spacewatch ||  || align=right | 3.1 km || 
|-id=775 bgcolor=#fefefe
| 515775 ||  || — || September 21, 2009 || Kitt Peak || Spacewatch ||  || align=right data-sort-value="0.59" | 590 m || 
|-id=776 bgcolor=#E9E9E9
| 515776 ||  || — || December 3, 2004 || Kitt Peak || Spacewatch ||  || align=right | 1.6 km || 
|-id=777 bgcolor=#fefefe
| 515777 ||  || — || March 11, 2008 || Mount Lemmon || Mount Lemmon Survey ||  || align=right data-sort-value="0.55" | 550 m || 
|-id=778 bgcolor=#fefefe
| 515778 ||  || — || October 18, 2012 || Haleakala || Pan-STARRS ||  || align=right data-sort-value="0.71" | 710 m || 
|-id=779 bgcolor=#fefefe
| 515779 ||  || — || March 31, 2015 || Haleakala || Pan-STARRS ||  || align=right data-sort-value="0.90" | 900 m || 
|-id=780 bgcolor=#fefefe
| 515780 ||  || — || August 17, 2012 || Haleakala || Pan-STARRS ||  || align=right data-sort-value="0.62" | 620 m || 
|-id=781 bgcolor=#fefefe
| 515781 ||  || — || April 13, 2008 || Kitt Peak || Spacewatch || (2076) || align=right data-sort-value="0.62" | 620 m || 
|-id=782 bgcolor=#E9E9E9
| 515782 ||  || — || February 25, 2006 || Kitt Peak || Spacewatch ||  || align=right data-sort-value="0.85" | 850 m || 
|-id=783 bgcolor=#E9E9E9
| 515783 ||  || — || May 24, 2015 || Haleakala || Pan-STARRS || BRG || align=right | 1.7 km || 
|-id=784 bgcolor=#fefefe
| 515784 ||  || — || March 28, 2015 || Haleakala || Pan-STARRS ||  || align=right data-sort-value="0.81" | 810 m || 
|-id=785 bgcolor=#fefefe
| 515785 ||  || — || September 4, 2008 || Kitt Peak || Spacewatch ||  || align=right data-sort-value="0.82" | 820 m || 
|-id=786 bgcolor=#fefefe
| 515786 ||  || — || October 3, 2006 || Mount Lemmon || Mount Lemmon Survey ||  || align=right data-sort-value="0.71" | 710 m || 
|-id=787 bgcolor=#d6d6d6
| 515787 ||  || — || February 10, 2007 || Mount Lemmon || Mount Lemmon Survey ||  || align=right | 2.7 km || 
|-id=788 bgcolor=#fefefe
| 515788 ||  || — || February 21, 2007 || Mount Lemmon || Mount Lemmon Survey ||  || align=right data-sort-value="0.65" | 650 m || 
|-id=789 bgcolor=#E9E9E9
| 515789 ||  || — || November 7, 2012 || Mount Lemmon || Mount Lemmon Survey ||  || align=right | 1.1 km || 
|-id=790 bgcolor=#E9E9E9
| 515790 ||  || — || May 19, 2006 || Mount Lemmon || Mount Lemmon Survey ||  || align=right | 1.5 km || 
|-id=791 bgcolor=#fefefe
| 515791 ||  || — || March 22, 2015 || Haleakala || Pan-STARRS ||  || align=right | 1.1 km || 
|-id=792 bgcolor=#E9E9E9
| 515792 ||  || — || January 11, 2008 || Mount Lemmon || Mount Lemmon Survey ||  || align=right | 2.5 km || 
|-id=793 bgcolor=#fefefe
| 515793 ||  || — || September 6, 2008 || Catalina || CSS ||  || align=right data-sort-value="0.77" | 770 m || 
|-id=794 bgcolor=#fefefe
| 515794 ||  || — || March 16, 2004 || Kitt Peak || Spacewatch ||  || align=right data-sort-value="0.68" | 680 m || 
|-id=795 bgcolor=#E9E9E9
| 515795 ||  || — || August 3, 2011 || Haleakala || Pan-STARRS ||  || align=right | 1.2 km || 
|-id=796 bgcolor=#d6d6d6
| 515796 ||  || — || June 15, 2015 || Haleakala || Pan-STARRS ||  || align=right | 2.6 km || 
|-id=797 bgcolor=#E9E9E9
| 515797 ||  || — || August 2, 2011 || Haleakala || Pan-STARRS ||  || align=right | 1.0 km || 
|-id=798 bgcolor=#E9E9E9
| 515798 ||  || — || July 1, 2011 || Kitt Peak || Spacewatch ||  || align=right | 1.2 km || 
|-id=799 bgcolor=#E9E9E9
| 515799 ||  || — || December 31, 2008 || Kitt Peak || Spacewatch ||  || align=right | 1.7 km || 
|-id=800 bgcolor=#E9E9E9
| 515800 ||  || — || January 5, 2013 || Mount Lemmon || Mount Lemmon Survey ||  || align=right | 1.8 km || 
|}

515801–515900 

|-bgcolor=#E9E9E9
| 515801 ||  || — || February 27, 2006 || Mount Lemmon || Mount Lemmon Survey ||  || align=right data-sort-value="0.85" | 850 m || 
|-id=802 bgcolor=#E9E9E9
| 515802 ||  || — || April 24, 2006 || Kitt Peak || Spacewatch ||  || align=right | 1.3 km || 
|-id=803 bgcolor=#E9E9E9
| 515803 ||  || — || September 25, 2011 || Haleakala || Pan-STARRS ||  || align=right | 1.9 km || 
|-id=804 bgcolor=#fefefe
| 515804 ||  || — || March 13, 2011 || Mount Lemmon || Mount Lemmon Survey ||  || align=right data-sort-value="0.62" | 620 m || 
|-id=805 bgcolor=#fefefe
| 515805 ||  || — || October 11, 2012 || Haleakala || Pan-STARRS ||  || align=right data-sort-value="0.78" | 780 m || 
|-id=806 bgcolor=#fefefe
| 515806 ||  || — || October 5, 2012 || Haleakala || Pan-STARRS ||  || align=right data-sort-value="0.65" | 650 m || 
|-id=807 bgcolor=#fefefe
| 515807 ||  || — || January 24, 2014 || Haleakala || Pan-STARRS ||  || align=right data-sort-value="0.66" | 660 m || 
|-id=808 bgcolor=#fefefe
| 515808 ||  || — || April 6, 2011 || Mount Lemmon || Mount Lemmon Survey ||  || align=right data-sort-value="0.77" | 770 m || 
|-id=809 bgcolor=#fefefe
| 515809 ||  || — || February 26, 2014 || Haleakala || Pan-STARRS ||  || align=right data-sort-value="0.91" | 910 m || 
|-id=810 bgcolor=#E9E9E9
| 515810 ||  || — || September 21, 2011 || Kitt Peak || Spacewatch ||  || align=right | 1.6 km || 
|-id=811 bgcolor=#E9E9E9
| 515811 ||  || — || December 5, 2007 || Kitt Peak || Spacewatch ||  || align=right | 2.1 km || 
|-id=812 bgcolor=#fefefe
| 515812 ||  || — || October 20, 2012 || Haleakala || Pan-STARRS ||  || align=right data-sort-value="0.77" | 770 m || 
|-id=813 bgcolor=#fefefe
| 515813 ||  || — || April 25, 2015 || Haleakala || Pan-STARRS ||  || align=right | 1.2 km || 
|-id=814 bgcolor=#fefefe
| 515814 ||  || — || May 30, 2008 || Mount Lemmon || Mount Lemmon Survey ||  || align=right data-sort-value="0.66" | 660 m || 
|-id=815 bgcolor=#E9E9E9
| 515815 ||  || — || December 12, 2004 || Kitt Peak || Spacewatch ||  || align=right | 1.1 km || 
|-id=816 bgcolor=#fefefe
| 515816 ||  || — || October 27, 2008 || Kitt Peak || Spacewatch ||  || align=right data-sort-value="0.82" | 820 m || 
|-id=817 bgcolor=#fefefe
| 515817 ||  || — || April 20, 2007 || Kitt Peak || Spacewatch ||  || align=right data-sort-value="0.75" | 750 m || 
|-id=818 bgcolor=#fefefe
| 515818 ||  || — || October 8, 2008 || Mount Lemmon || Mount Lemmon Survey ||  || align=right data-sort-value="0.80" | 800 m || 
|-id=819 bgcolor=#fefefe
| 515819 ||  || — || April 23, 2011 || Haleakala || Pan-STARRS ||  || align=right data-sort-value="0.57" | 570 m || 
|-id=820 bgcolor=#d6d6d6
| 515820 ||  || — || April 2, 2006 || Kitt Peak || Spacewatch || Tj (2.97) || align=right | 3.7 km || 
|-id=821 bgcolor=#fefefe
| 515821 ||  || — || November 23, 2012 || Kitt Peak || Spacewatch ||  || align=right data-sort-value="0.79" | 790 m || 
|-id=822 bgcolor=#fefefe
| 515822 ||  || — || October 11, 2005 || Kitt Peak || Spacewatch ||  || align=right data-sort-value="0.69" | 690 m || 
|-id=823 bgcolor=#d6d6d6
| 515823 ||  || — || December 24, 2011 || Catalina || CSS ||  || align=right | 3.2 km || 
|-id=824 bgcolor=#E9E9E9
| 515824 ||  || — || March 11, 2014 || Mount Lemmon || Mount Lemmon Survey ||  || align=right | 1.1 km || 
|-id=825 bgcolor=#fefefe
| 515825 ||  || — || March 6, 2011 || Mount Lemmon || Mount Lemmon Survey ||  || align=right data-sort-value="0.59" | 590 m || 
|-id=826 bgcolor=#E9E9E9
| 515826 ||  || — || August 27, 2006 || Kitt Peak || Spacewatch ||  || align=right | 1.8 km || 
|-id=827 bgcolor=#E9E9E9
| 515827 ||  || — || July 2, 2011 || Mount Lemmon || Mount Lemmon Survey ||  || align=right data-sort-value="0.82" | 820 m || 
|-id=828 bgcolor=#d6d6d6
| 515828 ||  || — || October 31, 2005 || Mount Lemmon || Mount Lemmon Survey ||  || align=right | 2.1 km || 
|-id=829 bgcolor=#E9E9E9
| 515829 ||  || — || February 20, 2009 || Kitt Peak || Spacewatch ||  || align=right | 2.4 km || 
|-id=830 bgcolor=#E9E9E9
| 515830 ||  || — || October 8, 2007 || Mount Lemmon || Mount Lemmon Survey ||  || align=right | 1.2 km || 
|-id=831 bgcolor=#E9E9E9
| 515831 ||  || — || August 5, 2010 || WISE || WISE ||  || align=right | 1.9 km || 
|-id=832 bgcolor=#E9E9E9
| 515832 ||  || — || September 18, 2007 || Mount Lemmon || Mount Lemmon Survey ||  || align=right | 1.2 km || 
|-id=833 bgcolor=#fefefe
| 515833 ||  || — || October 2, 2008 || Kitt Peak || Spacewatch ||  || align=right data-sort-value="0.78" | 780 m || 
|-id=834 bgcolor=#fefefe
| 515834 ||  || — || October 27, 2008 || Mount Lemmon || Mount Lemmon Survey ||  || align=right data-sort-value="0.90" | 900 m || 
|-id=835 bgcolor=#E9E9E9
| 515835 ||  || — || June 30, 2010 || WISE || WISE ||  || align=right | 1.9 km || 
|-id=836 bgcolor=#E9E9E9
| 515836 ||  || — || June 16, 2006 || Kitt Peak || Spacewatch ||  || align=right | 1.6 km || 
|-id=837 bgcolor=#E9E9E9
| 515837 ||  || — || December 31, 2008 || Kitt Peak || Spacewatch ||  || align=right data-sort-value="0.98" | 980 m || 
|-id=838 bgcolor=#d6d6d6
| 515838 ||  || — || October 20, 2006 || Catalina || CSS ||  || align=right | 2.9 km || 
|-id=839 bgcolor=#E9E9E9
| 515839 ||  || — || February 14, 2010 || Kitt Peak || Spacewatch ||  || align=right | 1.1 km || 
|-id=840 bgcolor=#E9E9E9
| 515840 ||  || — || July 9, 2015 || Haleakala || Pan-STARRS ||  || align=right | 1.4 km || 
|-id=841 bgcolor=#fefefe
| 515841 ||  || — || June 6, 2011 || Haleakala || Pan-STARRS ||  || align=right data-sort-value="0.78" | 780 m || 
|-id=842 bgcolor=#fefefe
| 515842 ||  || — || February 8, 2007 || Kitt Peak || Spacewatch ||  || align=right data-sort-value="0.74" | 740 m || 
|-id=843 bgcolor=#E9E9E9
| 515843 ||  || — || August 28, 2011 || Haleakala || Pan-STARRS ||  || align=right data-sort-value="0.89" | 890 m || 
|-id=844 bgcolor=#E9E9E9
| 515844 ||  || — || August 18, 2006 || Kitt Peak || Spacewatch ||  || align=right | 1.8 km || 
|-id=845 bgcolor=#d6d6d6
| 515845 ||  || — || May 7, 2014 || Haleakala || Pan-STARRS ||  || align=right | 2.4 km || 
|-id=846 bgcolor=#d6d6d6
| 515846 ||  || — || July 24, 2010 || WISE || WISE ||  || align=right | 2.9 km || 
|-id=847 bgcolor=#fefefe
| 515847 ||  || — || November 7, 2012 || Mount Lemmon || Mount Lemmon Survey ||  || align=right data-sort-value="0.87" | 870 m || 
|-id=848 bgcolor=#fefefe
| 515848 ||  || — || July 31, 2008 || La Sagra || OAM Obs. ||  || align=right data-sort-value="0.65" | 650 m || 
|-id=849 bgcolor=#E9E9E9
| 515849 ||  || — || August 23, 2011 || Haleakala || Pan-STARRS ||  || align=right | 1.1 km || 
|-id=850 bgcolor=#E9E9E9
| 515850 ||  || — || February 26, 2009 || Catalina || CSS ||  || align=right | 1.8 km || 
|-id=851 bgcolor=#d6d6d6
| 515851 ||  || — || December 25, 2011 || Mount Lemmon || Mount Lemmon Survey ||  || align=right | 2.7 km || 
|-id=852 bgcolor=#fefefe
| 515852 ||  || — || July 26, 2015 || Haleakala || Pan-STARRS ||  || align=right | 1.1 km || 
|-id=853 bgcolor=#E9E9E9
| 515853 ||  || — || November 2, 2007 || Kitt Peak || Spacewatch ||  || align=right | 1.8 km || 
|-id=854 bgcolor=#E9E9E9
| 515854 ||  || — || September 14, 2007 || Mount Lemmon || Mount Lemmon Survey ||  || align=right | 1.2 km || 
|-id=855 bgcolor=#E9E9E9
| 515855 ||  || — || August 23, 2011 || Haleakala || Pan-STARRS ||  || align=right | 1.4 km || 
|-id=856 bgcolor=#E9E9E9
| 515856 ||  || — || April 21, 2006 || Kitt Peak || Spacewatch ||  || align=right data-sort-value="0.94" | 940 m || 
|-id=857 bgcolor=#d6d6d6
| 515857 ||  || — || February 21, 2007 || Mount Lemmon || Mount Lemmon Survey ||  || align=right | 3.2 km || 
|-id=858 bgcolor=#d6d6d6
| 515858 ||  || — || May 28, 2014 || Haleakala || Pan-STARRS ||  || align=right | 1.9 km || 
|-id=859 bgcolor=#E9E9E9
| 515859 ||  || — || February 16, 2013 || Mount Lemmon || Mount Lemmon Survey ||  || align=right | 2.0 km || 
|-id=860 bgcolor=#d6d6d6
| 515860 ||  || — || April 7, 2008 || Kitt Peak || Spacewatch ||  || align=right | 2.9 km || 
|-id=861 bgcolor=#E9E9E9
| 515861 ||  || — || January 10, 2013 || Kitt Peak || Spacewatch ||  || align=right | 1.3 km || 
|-id=862 bgcolor=#fefefe
| 515862 ||  || — || March 15, 2007 || Mount Lemmon || Mount Lemmon Survey ||  || align=right data-sort-value="0.86" | 860 m || 
|-id=863 bgcolor=#d6d6d6
| 515863 ||  || — || November 14, 2006 || Kitt Peak || Spacewatch ||  || align=right | 1.8 km || 
|-id=864 bgcolor=#E9E9E9
| 515864 ||  || — || September 13, 2007 || Mount Lemmon || Mount Lemmon Survey ||  || align=right data-sort-value="0.75" | 750 m || 
|-id=865 bgcolor=#E9E9E9
| 515865 ||  || — || February 28, 2014 || Haleakala || Pan-STARRS ||  || align=right data-sort-value="0.75" | 750 m || 
|-id=866 bgcolor=#E9E9E9
| 515866 ||  || — || July 25, 1995 || Kitt Peak || Spacewatch ||  || align=right data-sort-value="0.94" | 940 m || 
|-id=867 bgcolor=#d6d6d6
| 515867 ||  || — || September 9, 2010 || Kitt Peak || Spacewatch ||  || align=right | 2.1 km || 
|-id=868 bgcolor=#d6d6d6
| 515868 ||  || — || July 9, 2010 || WISE || WISE ||  || align=right | 2.3 km || 
|-id=869 bgcolor=#E9E9E9
| 515869 ||  || — || September 24, 2011 || Haleakala || Pan-STARRS ||  || align=right | 1.9 km || 
|-id=870 bgcolor=#d6d6d6
| 515870 ||  || — || February 15, 2013 || Haleakala || Pan-STARRS ||  || align=right | 2.4 km || 
|-id=871 bgcolor=#E9E9E9
| 515871 ||  || — || September 10, 2007 || Kitt Peak || Spacewatch ||  || align=right | 1.0 km || 
|-id=872 bgcolor=#E9E9E9
| 515872 ||  || — || July 1, 2011 || Haleakala || Pan-STARRS ||  || align=right | 1.6 km || 
|-id=873 bgcolor=#fefefe
| 515873 ||  || — || February 26, 2014 || Haleakala || Pan-STARRS ||  || align=right data-sort-value="0.82" | 820 m || 
|-id=874 bgcolor=#d6d6d6
| 515874 ||  || — || January 17, 2007 || Kitt Peak || Spacewatch ||  || align=right | 2.0 km || 
|-id=875 bgcolor=#fefefe
| 515875 ||  || — || February 26, 2014 || Haleakala || Pan-STARRS ||  || align=right data-sort-value="0.94" | 940 m || 
|-id=876 bgcolor=#E9E9E9
| 515876 ||  || — || September 12, 2007 || Catalina || CSS ||  || align=right data-sort-value="0.90" | 900 m || 
|-id=877 bgcolor=#E9E9E9
| 515877 ||  || — || July 21, 2003 || Campo Imperatore || CINEOS ||  || align=right | 1.4 km || 
|-id=878 bgcolor=#fefefe
| 515878 ||  || — || September 11, 2004 || Kitt Peak || Spacewatch ||  || align=right data-sort-value="0.64" | 640 m || 
|-id=879 bgcolor=#fefefe
| 515879 ||  || — || May 13, 2010 || WISE || WISE ||  || align=right | 1.0 km || 
|-id=880 bgcolor=#fefefe
| 515880 ||  || — || January 2, 2013 || Mount Lemmon || Mount Lemmon Survey ||  || align=right data-sort-value="0.95" | 950 m || 
|-id=881 bgcolor=#E9E9E9
| 515881 ||  || — || August 28, 2006 || Kitt Peak || Spacewatch ||  || align=right | 2.0 km || 
|-id=882 bgcolor=#E9E9E9
| 515882 ||  || — || September 4, 2011 || Haleakala || Pan-STARRS ||  || align=right | 1.8 km || 
|-id=883 bgcolor=#E9E9E9
| 515883 ||  || — || August 20, 2003 || Campo Imperatore || CINEOS ||  || align=right data-sort-value="0.88" | 880 m || 
|-id=884 bgcolor=#fefefe
| 515884 ||  || — || March 5, 2006 || Kitt Peak || Spacewatch ||  || align=right data-sort-value="0.89" | 890 m || 
|-id=885 bgcolor=#E9E9E9
| 515885 ||  || — || March 23, 2006 || Kitt Peak || Spacewatch ||  || align=right data-sort-value="0.77" | 770 m || 
|-id=886 bgcolor=#E9E9E9
| 515886 ||  || — || October 22, 2011 || Mount Lemmon || Mount Lemmon Survey ||  || align=right | 2.2 km || 
|-id=887 bgcolor=#E9E9E9
| 515887 ||  || — || September 21, 2011 || Kitt Peak || Spacewatch ||  || align=right | 1.9 km || 
|-id=888 bgcolor=#fefefe
| 515888 ||  || — || April 28, 2003 || Kitt Peak || Spacewatch ||  || align=right data-sort-value="0.83" | 830 m || 
|-id=889 bgcolor=#E9E9E9
| 515889 ||  || — || March 12, 2014 || Mount Lemmon || Mount Lemmon Survey ||  || align=right | 1.4 km || 
|-id=890 bgcolor=#d6d6d6
| 515890 ||  || — || January 13, 2008 || Kitt Peak || Spacewatch ||  || align=right | 2.0 km || 
|-id=891 bgcolor=#E9E9E9
| 515891 ||  || — || September 15, 2007 || Mount Lemmon || Mount Lemmon Survey ||  || align=right | 1.4 km || 
|-id=892 bgcolor=#E9E9E9
| 515892 ||  || — || November 19, 2003 || Kitt Peak || Spacewatch ||  || align=right | 1.5 km || 
|-id=893 bgcolor=#fefefe
| 515893 ||  || — || December 21, 2005 || Kitt Peak || Spacewatch ||  || align=right data-sort-value="0.94" | 940 m || 
|-id=894 bgcolor=#E9E9E9
| 515894 ||  || — || December 17, 2007 || Kitt Peak || Spacewatch ||  || align=right | 2.3 km || 
|-id=895 bgcolor=#E9E9E9
| 515895 ||  || — || April 14, 2005 || Kitt Peak || Spacewatch ||  || align=right | 1.7 km || 
|-id=896 bgcolor=#E9E9E9
| 515896 ||  || — || August 27, 2011 || Haleakala || Pan-STARRS ||  || align=right | 1.2 km || 
|-id=897 bgcolor=#E9E9E9
| 515897 ||  || — || July 2, 2011 || Mount Lemmon || Mount Lemmon Survey ||  || align=right data-sort-value="0.93" | 930 m || 
|-id=898 bgcolor=#E9E9E9
| 515898 ||  || — || July 24, 1995 || Kitt Peak || Spacewatch ||  || align=right | 1.0 km || 
|-id=899 bgcolor=#fefefe
| 515899 ||  || — || March 28, 2004 || Kitt Peak || Spacewatch ||  || align=right data-sort-value="0.64" | 640 m || 
|-id=900 bgcolor=#fefefe
| 515900 ||  || — || April 24, 2000 || Kitt Peak || Spacewatch ||  || align=right data-sort-value="0.88" | 880 m || 
|}

515901–516000 

|-bgcolor=#d6d6d6
| 515901 ||  || — || September 27, 2006 || Kitt Peak || Spacewatch ||  || align=right | 1.9 km || 
|-id=902 bgcolor=#fefefe
| 515902 ||  || — || April 28, 2011 || Kitt Peak || Spacewatch ||  || align=right data-sort-value="0.84" | 840 m || 
|-id=903 bgcolor=#fefefe
| 515903 ||  || — || March 11, 2007 || Kitt Peak || Spacewatch ||  || align=right data-sort-value="0.75" | 750 m || 
|-id=904 bgcolor=#fefefe
| 515904 ||  || — || September 11, 2004 || Kitt Peak || Spacewatch || NYS || align=right data-sort-value="0.63" | 630 m || 
|-id=905 bgcolor=#fefefe
| 515905 ||  || — || May 8, 2011 || Kitt Peak || Spacewatch || V || align=right data-sort-value="0.57" | 570 m || 
|-id=906 bgcolor=#fefefe
| 515906 ||  || — || March 12, 2007 || Mount Lemmon || Mount Lemmon Survey ||  || align=right data-sort-value="0.62" | 620 m || 
|-id=907 bgcolor=#fefefe
| 515907 ||  || — || October 7, 2008 || Kitt Peak || Spacewatch ||  || align=right data-sort-value="0.68" | 680 m || 
|-id=908 bgcolor=#d6d6d6
| 515908 ||  || — || March 5, 2013 || Haleakala || Pan-STARRS ||  || align=right | 2.1 km || 
|-id=909 bgcolor=#E9E9E9
| 515909 ||  || — || September 14, 2007 || Mount Lemmon || Mount Lemmon Survey ||  || align=right | 1.2 km || 
|-id=910 bgcolor=#fefefe
| 515910 ||  || — || September 7, 2004 || Kitt Peak || Spacewatch ||  || align=right data-sort-value="0.79" | 790 m || 
|-id=911 bgcolor=#d6d6d6
| 515911 ||  || — || June 9, 2010 || WISE || WISE || NAE || align=right | 2.1 km || 
|-id=912 bgcolor=#E9E9E9
| 515912 ||  || — || September 4, 2011 || Haleakala || Pan-STARRS ||  || align=right | 1.2 km || 
|-id=913 bgcolor=#fefefe
| 515913 ||  || — || January 1, 2009 || Kitt Peak || Spacewatch ||  || align=right data-sort-value="0.88" | 880 m || 
|-id=914 bgcolor=#E9E9E9
| 515914 ||  || — || October 19, 2011 || Haleakala || Pan-STARRS ||  || align=right | 1.8 km || 
|-id=915 bgcolor=#d6d6d6
| 515915 ||  || — || February 9, 2007 || Catalina || CSS ||  || align=right | 2.5 km || 
|-id=916 bgcolor=#d6d6d6
| 515916 ||  || — || February 16, 2012 || Haleakala || Pan-STARRS ||  || align=right | 3.2 km || 
|-id=917 bgcolor=#fefefe
| 515917 ||  || — || November 9, 2008 || Mount Lemmon || Mount Lemmon Survey ||  || align=right data-sort-value="0.82" | 820 m || 
|-id=918 bgcolor=#d6d6d6
| 515918 ||  || — || November 17, 2006 || Kitt Peak || Spacewatch ||  || align=right | 2.9 km || 
|-id=919 bgcolor=#E9E9E9
| 515919 ||  || — || January 11, 2008 || Mount Lemmon || Mount Lemmon Survey ||  || align=right | 2.1 km || 
|-id=920 bgcolor=#E9E9E9
| 515920 ||  || — || October 2, 2006 || Mount Lemmon || Mount Lemmon Survey ||  || align=right | 2.1 km || 
|-id=921 bgcolor=#E9E9E9
| 515921 ||  || — || September 25, 2007 || Mount Lemmon || Mount Lemmon Survey ||  || align=right | 1.4 km || 
|-id=922 bgcolor=#d6d6d6
| 515922 ||  || — || February 1, 2013 || Kitt Peak || Spacewatch ||  || align=right | 2.1 km || 
|-id=923 bgcolor=#fefefe
| 515923 ||  || — || May 3, 2003 || Kitt Peak || Spacewatch ||  || align=right data-sort-value="0.85" | 850 m || 
|-id=924 bgcolor=#d6d6d6
| 515924 ||  || — || May 21, 2014 || Haleakala || Pan-STARRS ||  || align=right | 2.6 km || 
|-id=925 bgcolor=#fefefe
| 515925 ||  || — || June 3, 2011 || Mount Lemmon || Mount Lemmon Survey ||  || align=right | 1.3 km || 
|-id=926 bgcolor=#E9E9E9
| 515926 ||  || — || April 4, 2014 || Haleakala || Pan-STARRS ||  || align=right | 1.4 km || 
|-id=927 bgcolor=#d6d6d6
| 515927 ||  || — || October 25, 2005 || Mount Lemmon || Mount Lemmon Survey ||  || align=right | 2.4 km || 
|-id=928 bgcolor=#d6d6d6
| 515928 ||  || — || February 15, 2013 || Haleakala || Pan-STARRS ||  || align=right | 2.2 km || 
|-id=929 bgcolor=#d6d6d6
| 515929 ||  || — || February 3, 2012 || Haleakala || Pan-STARRS ||  || align=right | 2.3 km || 
|-id=930 bgcolor=#d6d6d6
| 515930 ||  || — || January 23, 2012 || Catalina || CSS ||  || align=right | 4.2 km || 
|-id=931 bgcolor=#d6d6d6
| 515931 ||  || — || March 13, 2008 || Mount Lemmon || Mount Lemmon Survey ||  || align=right | 2.3 km || 
|-id=932 bgcolor=#E9E9E9
| 515932 ||  || — || June 24, 2010 || Mount Lemmon || Mount Lemmon Survey ||  || align=right | 3.0 km || 
|-id=933 bgcolor=#E9E9E9
| 515933 ||  || — || March 2, 2009 || Mount Lemmon || Mount Lemmon Survey ||  || align=right | 2.2 km || 
|-id=934 bgcolor=#d6d6d6
| 515934 ||  || — || October 10, 2010 || Mount Lemmon || Mount Lemmon Survey ||  || align=right | 2.5 km || 
|-id=935 bgcolor=#fefefe
| 515935 ||  || — || September 3, 2008 || Kitt Peak || Spacewatch ||  || align=right data-sort-value="0.65" | 650 m || 
|-id=936 bgcolor=#E9E9E9
| 515936 ||  || — || November 9, 1999 || Kitt Peak || Spacewatch ||  || align=right | 2.3 km || 
|-id=937 bgcolor=#d6d6d6
| 515937 ||  || — || February 17, 2007 || Kitt Peak || Spacewatch ||  || align=right | 2.9 km || 
|-id=938 bgcolor=#E9E9E9
| 515938 ||  || — || October 2, 2006 || Mount Lemmon || Mount Lemmon Survey ||  || align=right | 2.0 km || 
|-id=939 bgcolor=#d6d6d6
| 515939 ||  || — || October 9, 1999 || Socorro || LINEAR ||  || align=right | 3.3 km || 
|-id=940 bgcolor=#d6d6d6
| 515940 ||  || — || September 18, 2010 || Mount Lemmon || Mount Lemmon Survey ||  || align=right | 2.2 km || 
|-id=941 bgcolor=#d6d6d6
| 515941 ||  || — || September 20, 2009 || Mount Lemmon || Mount Lemmon Survey ||  || align=right | 3.4 km || 
|-id=942 bgcolor=#d6d6d6
| 515942 ||  || — || September 12, 2004 || Socorro || LINEAR ||  || align=right | 3.8 km || 
|-id=943 bgcolor=#E9E9E9
| 515943 ||  || — || July 9, 2011 || Haleakala || Pan-STARRS ||  || align=right | 1.5 km || 
|-id=944 bgcolor=#fefefe
| 515944 ||  || — || May 28, 2011 || Mount Lemmon || Mount Lemmon Survey ||  || align=right data-sort-value="0.87" | 870 m || 
|-id=945 bgcolor=#E9E9E9
| 515945 ||  || — || March 9, 2005 || Kitt Peak || Spacewatch ||  || align=right | 1.6 km || 
|-id=946 bgcolor=#fefefe
| 515946 ||  || — || April 26, 2003 || Kitt Peak || Spacewatch ||  || align=right data-sort-value="0.71" | 710 m || 
|-id=947 bgcolor=#d6d6d6
| 515947 ||  || — || March 6, 2013 || Haleakala || Pan-STARRS ||  || align=right | 2.4 km || 
|-id=948 bgcolor=#d6d6d6
| 515948 ||  || — || October 7, 2004 || Kitt Peak || Spacewatch ||  || align=right | 2.9 km || 
|-id=949 bgcolor=#d6d6d6
| 515949 ||  || — || September 11, 2005 || Kitt Peak || Spacewatch ||  || align=right | 2.1 km || 
|-id=950 bgcolor=#d6d6d6
| 515950 ||  || — || August 10, 2010 || Kitt Peak || Spacewatch ||  || align=right | 1.9 km || 
|-id=951 bgcolor=#d6d6d6
| 515951 ||  || — || September 22, 2004 || Kitt Peak || Spacewatch ||  || align=right | 2.1 km || 
|-id=952 bgcolor=#d6d6d6
| 515952 ||  || — || August 30, 2005 || Kitt Peak || Spacewatch ||  || align=right | 2.2 km || 
|-id=953 bgcolor=#d6d6d6
| 515953 ||  || — || March 1, 1998 || Kitt Peak || Spacewatch ||  || align=right | 2.7 km || 
|-id=954 bgcolor=#d6d6d6
| 515954 ||  || — || September 18, 2010 || Mount Lemmon || Mount Lemmon Survey ||  || align=right | 1.9 km || 
|-id=955 bgcolor=#d6d6d6
| 515955 ||  || — || March 5, 2008 || Mount Lemmon || Mount Lemmon Survey ||  || align=right | 2.1 km || 
|-id=956 bgcolor=#d6d6d6
| 515956 ||  || — || February 16, 2012 || Haleakala || Pan-STARRS ||  || align=right | 2.6 km || 
|-id=957 bgcolor=#E9E9E9
| 515957 ||  || — || September 26, 2006 || Kitt Peak || Spacewatch ||  || align=right | 2.0 km || 
|-id=958 bgcolor=#d6d6d6
| 515958 ||  || — || October 22, 2005 || Kitt Peak || Spacewatch ||  || align=right | 2.0 km || 
|-id=959 bgcolor=#E9E9E9
| 515959 ||  || — || September 21, 2011 || Haleakala || Pan-STARRS ||  || align=right | 1.2 km || 
|-id=960 bgcolor=#d6d6d6
| 515960 ||  || — || January 23, 2006 || Kitt Peak || Spacewatch ||  || align=right | 2.7 km || 
|-id=961 bgcolor=#fefefe
| 515961 ||  || — || September 21, 2008 || Kitt Peak || Spacewatch ||  || align=right data-sort-value="0.70" | 700 m || 
|-id=962 bgcolor=#fefefe
| 515962 ||  || — || March 13, 2007 || Mount Lemmon || Mount Lemmon Survey ||  || align=right data-sort-value="0.86" | 860 m || 
|-id=963 bgcolor=#fefefe
| 515963 ||  || — || September 9, 2004 || Socorro || LINEAR ||  || align=right data-sort-value="0.76" | 760 m || 
|-id=964 bgcolor=#d6d6d6
| 515964 ||  || — || January 30, 2012 || Mount Lemmon || Mount Lemmon Survey ||  || align=right | 3.6 km || 
|-id=965 bgcolor=#d6d6d6
| 515965 ||  || — || February 26, 2007 || Mount Lemmon || Mount Lemmon Survey ||  || align=right | 4.2 km || 
|-id=966 bgcolor=#E9E9E9
| 515966 ||  || — || June 20, 2010 || Mount Lemmon || Mount Lemmon Survey ||  || align=right | 2.2 km || 
|-id=967 bgcolor=#d6d6d6
| 515967 ||  || — || September 15, 2004 || Kitt Peak || Spacewatch || EOS || align=right | 2.2 km || 
|-id=968 bgcolor=#d6d6d6
| 515968 ||  || — || September 5, 2007 || Mount Lemmon || Mount Lemmon Survey || Tj (2.98) || align=right | 3.7 km || 
|-id=969 bgcolor=#d6d6d6
| 515969 ||  || — || September 2, 2010 || Mount Lemmon || Mount Lemmon Survey ||  || align=right | 2.2 km || 
|-id=970 bgcolor=#d6d6d6
| 515970 ||  || — || March 26, 2007 || Kitt Peak || Spacewatch ||  || align=right | 3.5 km || 
|-id=971 bgcolor=#d6d6d6
| 515971 ||  || — || March 4, 2008 || Kitt Peak || Spacewatch || BRA || align=right | 1.4 km || 
|-id=972 bgcolor=#d6d6d6
| 515972 ||  || — || November 4, 2004 || Catalina || CSS ||  || align=right | 3.2 km || 
|-id=973 bgcolor=#d6d6d6
| 515973 ||  || — || June 5, 2014 || Haleakala || Pan-STARRS ||  || align=right | 2.9 km || 
|-id=974 bgcolor=#d6d6d6
| 515974 ||  || — || January 10, 2007 || Mount Lemmon || Mount Lemmon Survey ||  || align=right | 2.3 km || 
|-id=975 bgcolor=#d6d6d6
| 515975 ||  || — || October 15, 2004 || Kitt Peak || Spacewatch ||  || align=right | 2.2 km || 
|-id=976 bgcolor=#E9E9E9
| 515976 ||  || — || March 4, 2014 || Haleakala || Pan-STARRS ||  || align=right | 1.2 km || 
|-id=977 bgcolor=#d6d6d6
| 515977 ||  || — || November 24, 2011 || Haleakala || Pan-STARRS ||  || align=right | 2.1 km || 
|-id=978 bgcolor=#E9E9E9
| 515978 ||  || — || October 2, 2006 || Mount Lemmon || Mount Lemmon Survey ||  || align=right | 2.3 km || 
|-id=979 bgcolor=#d6d6d6
| 515979 ||  || — || October 12, 2005 || Kitt Peak || Spacewatch || KOR || align=right | 1.2 km || 
|-id=980 bgcolor=#d6d6d6
| 515980 ||  || — || May 28, 2008 || Kitt Peak || Spacewatch || EOS || align=right | 1.6 km || 
|-id=981 bgcolor=#E9E9E9
| 515981 ||  || — || December 31, 2007 || Mount Lemmon || Mount Lemmon Survey ||  || align=right | 2.0 km || 
|-id=982 bgcolor=#E9E9E9
| 515982 ||  || — || August 29, 2006 || Kitt Peak || Spacewatch ||  || align=right | 1.4 km || 
|-id=983 bgcolor=#fefefe
| 515983 ||  || — || November 18, 2008 || Kitt Peak || Spacewatch ||  || align=right | 1.0 km || 
|-id=984 bgcolor=#d6d6d6
| 515984 ||  || — || August 12, 2015 || Haleakala || Pan-STARRS ||  || align=right | 2.3 km || 
|-id=985 bgcolor=#d6d6d6
| 515985 ||  || — || March 19, 2013 || Haleakala || Pan-STARRS ||  || align=right | 2.4 km || 
|-id=986 bgcolor=#d6d6d6
| 515986 ||  || — || January 22, 2006 || Mount Lemmon || Mount Lemmon Survey ||  || align=right | 2.3 km || 
|-id=987 bgcolor=#d6d6d6
| 515987 ||  || — || April 18, 2007 || Kitt Peak || Spacewatch ||  || align=right | 2.4 km || 
|-id=988 bgcolor=#E9E9E9
| 515988 ||  || — || September 28, 2006 || Kitt Peak || Spacewatch ||  || align=right | 1.7 km || 
|-id=989 bgcolor=#d6d6d6
| 515989 ||  || — || September 11, 2015 || Haleakala || Pan-STARRS ||  || align=right | 3.2 km || 
|-id=990 bgcolor=#d6d6d6
| 515990 ||  || — || August 12, 2015 || Haleakala || Pan-STARRS || BRA || align=right | 1.5 km || 
|-id=991 bgcolor=#d6d6d6
| 515991 ||  || — || October 12, 2004 || Kitt Peak || Spacewatch ||  || align=right | 3.1 km || 
|-id=992 bgcolor=#d6d6d6
| 515992 ||  || — || August 25, 2004 || Kitt Peak || Spacewatch ||  || align=right | 2.8 km || 
|-id=993 bgcolor=#d6d6d6
| 515993 ||  || — || May 2, 2008 || Mount Lemmon || Mount Lemmon Survey ||  || align=right | 2.1 km || 
|-id=994 bgcolor=#d6d6d6
| 515994 ||  || — || February 26, 2007 || Mount Lemmon || Mount Lemmon Survey ||  || align=right | 2.9 km || 
|-id=995 bgcolor=#d6d6d6
| 515995 ||  || — || October 1, 2005 || Mount Lemmon || Mount Lemmon Survey ||  || align=right | 1.9 km || 
|-id=996 bgcolor=#d6d6d6
| 515996 ||  || — || November 30, 2010 || Mount Lemmon || Mount Lemmon Survey ||  || align=right | 3.0 km || 
|-id=997 bgcolor=#d6d6d6
| 515997 ||  || — || October 31, 2010 || Mount Lemmon || Mount Lemmon Survey ||  || align=right | 2.5 km || 
|-id=998 bgcolor=#d6d6d6
| 515998 ||  || — || July 7, 2014 || Haleakala || Pan-STARRS ||  || align=right | 2.4 km || 
|-id=999 bgcolor=#d6d6d6
| 515999 ||  || — || September 15, 2004 || Kitt Peak || Spacewatch ||  || align=right | 2.4 km || 
|-id=000 bgcolor=#E9E9E9
| 516000 ||  || — || June 1, 2006 || Kitt Peak || Spacewatch || JUN || align=right | 1.1 km || 
|}

References

External links 
 Discovery Circumstances: Numbered Minor Planets (515001)–(520000) (IAU Minor Planet Center)

0515